= Belgium and weapons of mass destruction =

Kingdom of Belgium
- Nuclear weapons stationing start date: 1963; 63 years ago
- Nuclear weapons stationing provider: United States
- Current nuclear weapons stationed: 10–15 warheads

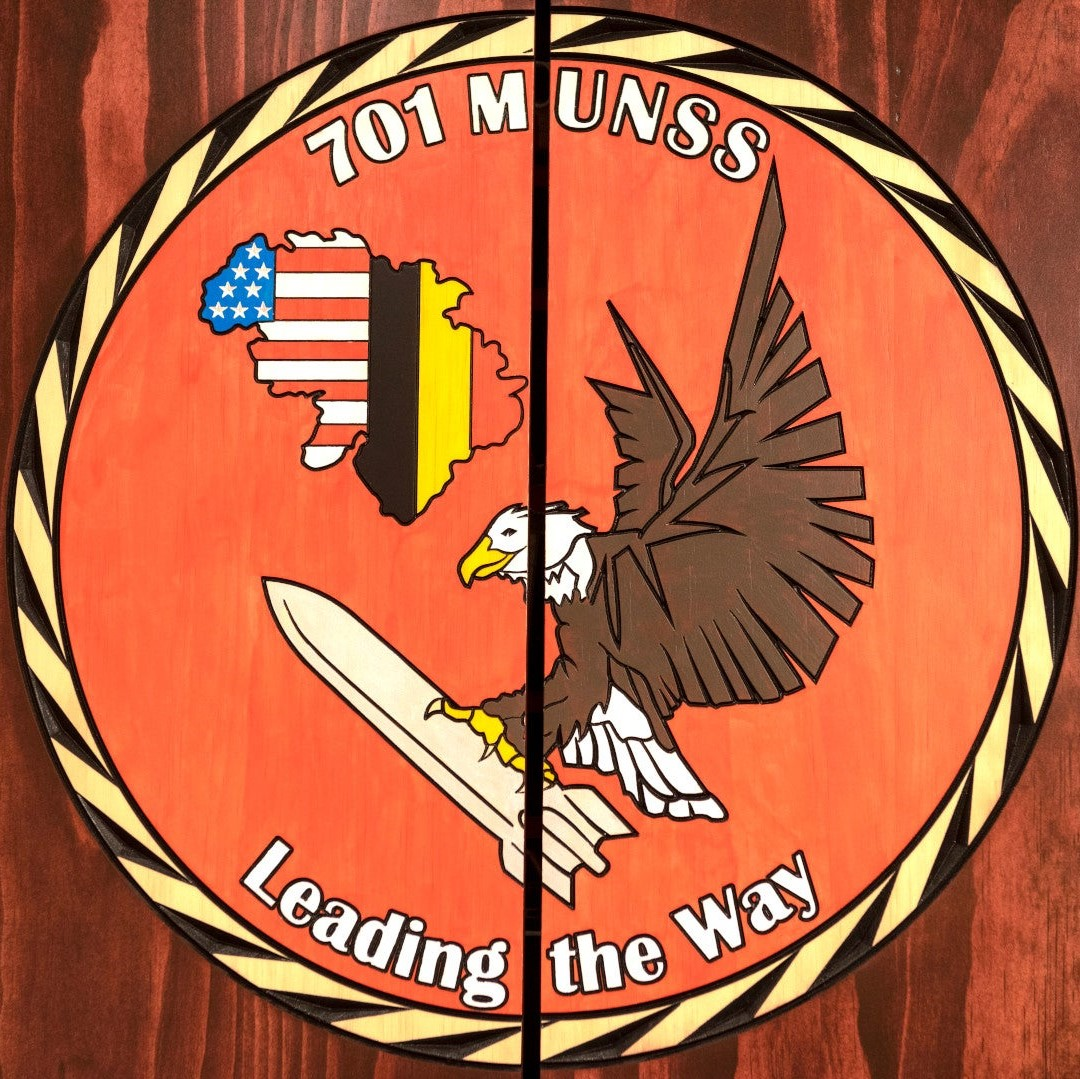
Unit insignia of the 701st MUNSS, with custody of United States nuclear weapons stored in Belgium. The weapon casing resembles the withdrawn B83 nuclear bomb.

The United States has stationed nuclear weapons in the Kingdom of Belgium since 1963. As of 2023, an estimated 10 to 15 B61 nuclear bombs are stored at Kleine Brogel Air Base, maintained by USAFE's 701st Munitions Support Squadron and designated for the usage of the Belgian 10th Tactical Wing, flying their F-16 MLU fighter jets.

== Nuclear weapons ==
=== Cold War ===
The United States has stationed nuclear weapons in the Kingdom of Belgium since 1963.

From 1984 to 1990, the US Air Force 485th Tactical Missile Wing was located at Florennes Air Base, deploying the BGM-109G Gryphon ground launched cruise missile system, which were removed in December 1988 as part of the Intermediate-Range Nuclear Forces Treaty.

=== Post-Cold War ===
The United States engages in nuclear sharing with seven NATO countries in Europe, including Belgium. This takes the form of an estimated 10 to 15 B61 nuclear gravity bombs, stored in Weapons Storage and Security Systems at Kleine Brogel Air Base. They are maintained by USAFE's 701st Munitions Support Squadron and designated for the usage of the Belgian 10th Tactical Wing, flying their F-16 MLU fighter jets.

On 16 January 2020, a resolution by John Crombez in the Belgian Chamber of Representatives, to remove the US nuclear weapons stationed in the country, was narrowly rejected by a vote of 66 to 74. This was partially in the context of the Treaty on the Prohibition of Nuclear Weapons, opened in 2017, which no NATO country has yet to sign.

== Chemical weapons ==
Belgium was the site of extensive chemical warfare between the Entente powers and German Empire, including the use of phosgene, chlorine, and mustard gas, during World War I.

Belgium signed the Chemical Weapons Convention in 1993 and ratified it in 1997.

== Biological weapons ==
Belgium signed the Biological Weapons Convention in 1972 and ratified it in 1979.
