= Nuclear sharing =

Aspect of nuclear deterrence strategy

Nuclear-armed states Nuclear-sharing states Nuclear-weapon-free zones (NWFZ) No nuclear weapons or sharing, but not NWFZ

Nuclear sharing is a concept in deterrence theory in which a nuclear-armed country deploys nuclear weapons on the territory of a country that does not possess nuclear weapons and extends its nuclear deterrent to that country. Nuclear sharing typically also involves joint planning and training processes for potentially using them, going beyond nuclear stationing or nuclear basing, which refer to a nuclear-armed country's deployment of nuclear weapons on foreign soil without an operational role for the host country's military and government.

It was originally conceived during the Cold War, when the United States and the Soviet Union placed their own nuclear weapons in many non-nuclear countries of the American-aligned First World and the Soviet-aligned Second World, as part of the nuclear arms race between the two sides. However, since the dissolution of the Soviet Union in 1991, the concept continues to be practiced by the United States and Russia. United States nuclear weapons, for delivery by fighter aircraft, are based in Belgium, Germany, Italy, the Netherlands, Turkey, and the United Kingdom. Russian nuclear weapons, for delivery by aircraft and short-range missiles, are deployed in Belarus.

As part of nuclear sharing, the participating countries carry out consultations and make common decisions on nuclear-weapons policy, training, and deployment, and maintain technical equipment (notably nuclear-capable aircraft) that is required for the delivery of nuclear weapons.In the event of a war that turns nuclear, the United States has publicly declared—with agreement from the Eighteen-Nation Committee on Disarmament (ENDC)—that the Non-Proliferation Treaty (NPT) would no longer be controlling.

== Types ==
=== Nuclear sharing ===
==== Non-substantive ====
In the modern form, via the usage of permissive action links (PALs), including anti-tampering systems, a host country is prevented from unilaterally detonating its shared weapons, on a short timeframe. This applies to currently shared United States and Russian weapons. Due to the lack of transfer of operational control, this has been described by scholars as non-substantive nuclear sharing.

==== Substantive ====
Historically, before the introduction of PALs in 1962, the US was aware that stationing or sharing agreements were insufficient to prevent host militaries from unilaterally seizing and using nuclear launch capabilities. Memorandums show that president Dwight D. Eisenhower's goal was to “give, to all intents and purposes, control of [American nuclear] weapons” to European allies and for the US to “retain titular possession only.” This has been described by scholars as substantive nuclear sharing. One example was the simple dual-key operation of PGM-17 Thor IRBMs in the United Kingdom under Project Emily. The Royal Air Force officer key began the missile launch sequence, and the United States Air Force officer key armed the warhead, with no real protection from British seizure of the American key.

=== Nuclear stationing ===
In contrast to nuclear sharing, foreign deployment of nuclear weapons and delivery systems, without cooperation from the host country's military, is termed nuclear stationing. This was the most common type of arrangement throughout the Cold War, including all foreign deployment by the USSR, and all US deployments in Asia and in European countries without sharing arrangements. Such early deployments were often highly secretive, with host governments sometimes not being informed entirely.

=== Technology transfer ===
A separate but related concept is nuclear weapons technology transfer, where a state is provided with assistance to develop an independent nuclear arsenal. Examples include French collaboration with the Israeli nuclear program, Soviet collaboration with the Chinese nuclear program, Chinese collaboration with the Pakistani nuclear program., and US-UK bilateral assistance after 1957.

== NATO ==
=== Historical ===
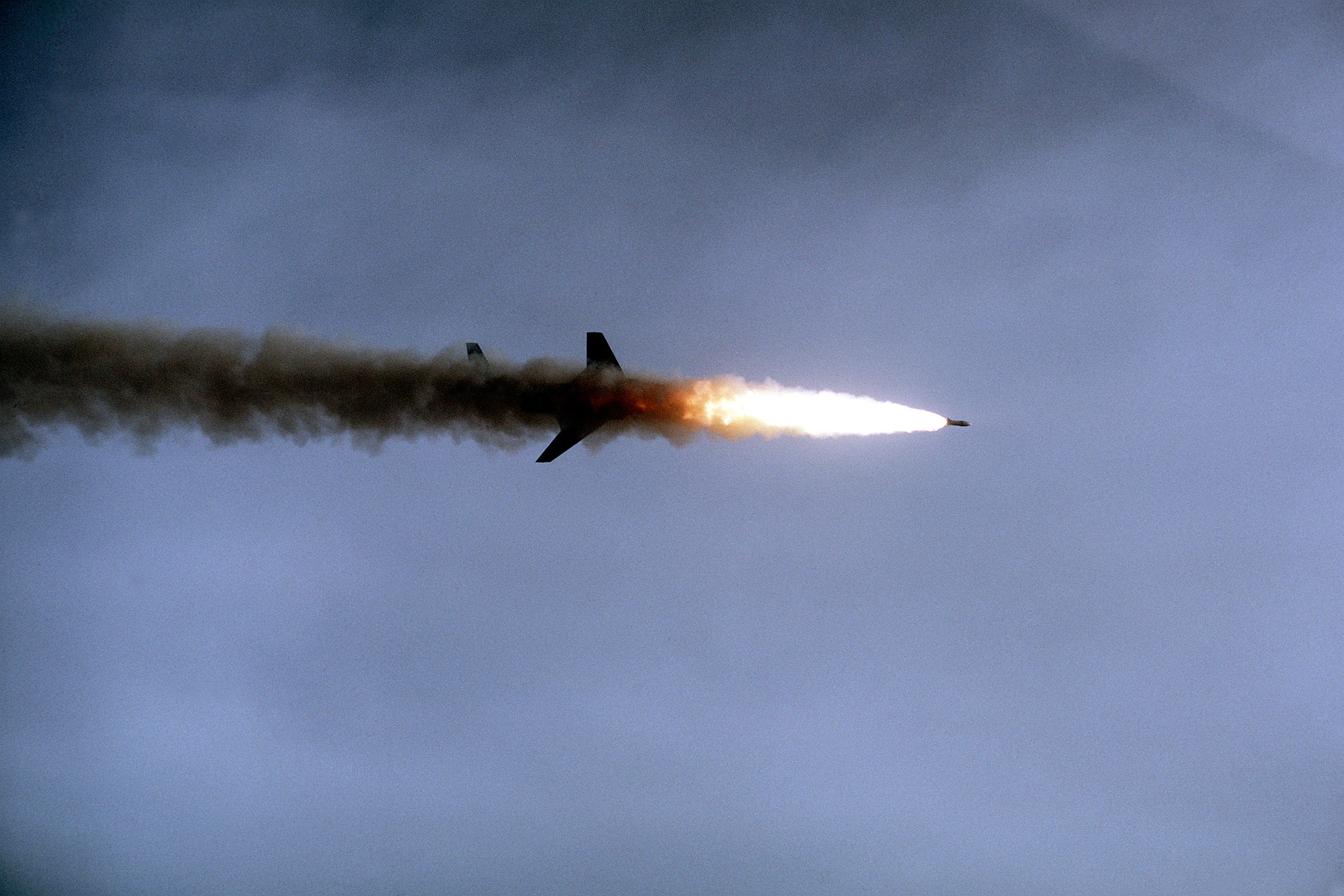
Canadian CF-101B assigned to NORAD, firing an inert version of the AIR-2 Genie nuclear-armed air-to-air missile in 1982

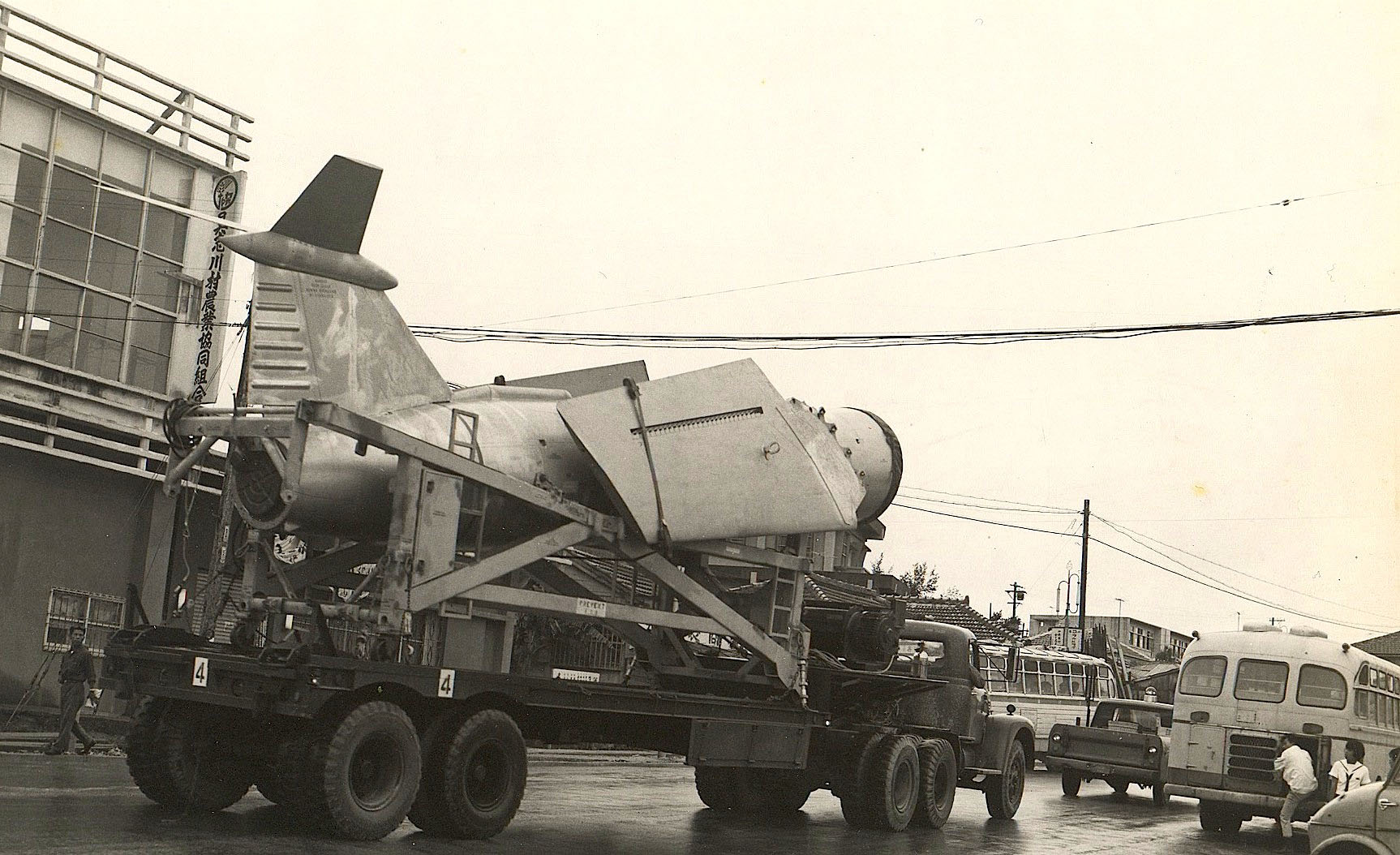
USAF MGM-13 Mace nuclear cruise missile in Okinawa, United States Civil Administration of the Ryukyu Islands, en route to Kadena Air Base, 1960s.

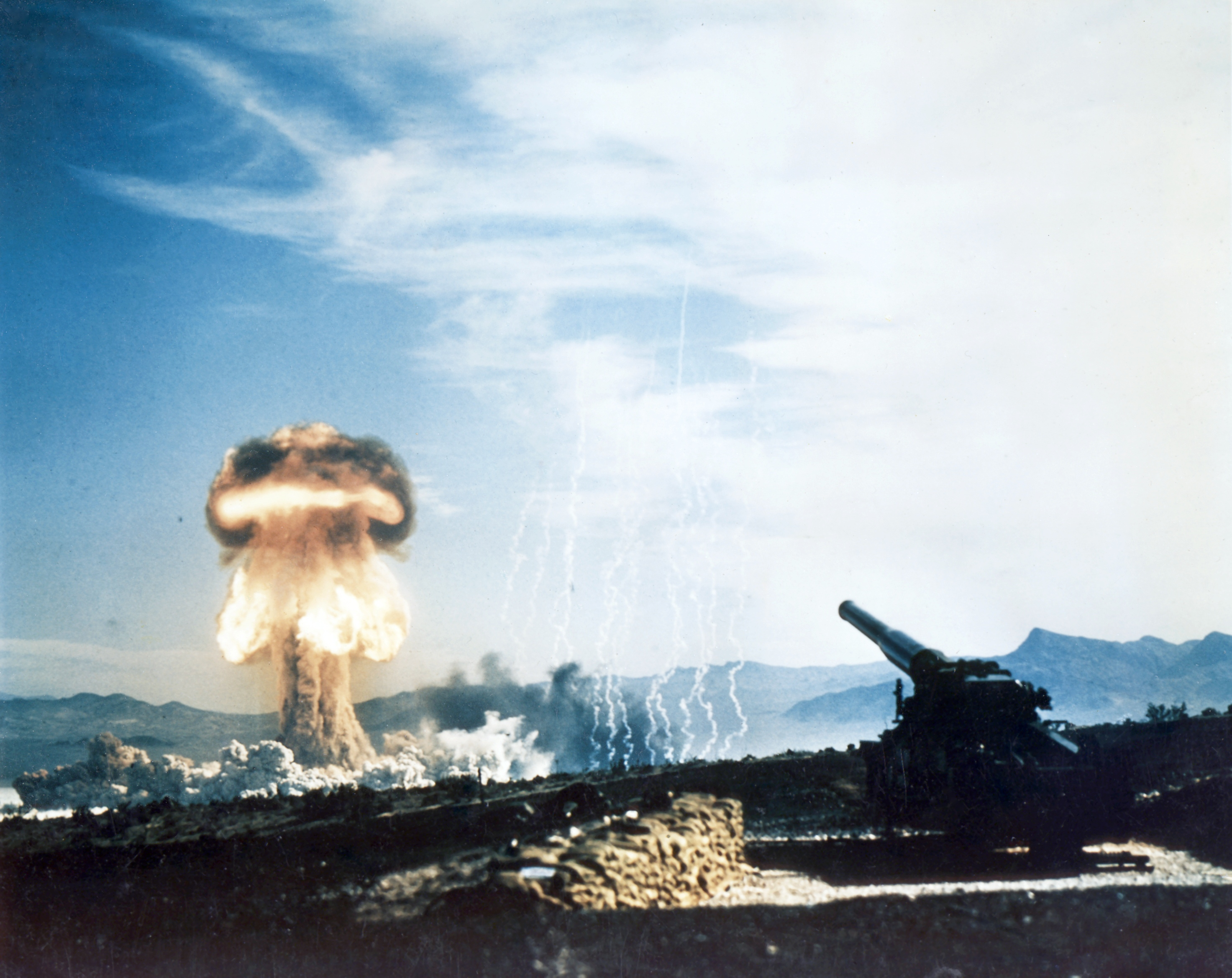
US nuclear artillery test in Nevada, 1953. Nuclear artillery was deployed throughout NATO countries in Europe, concentrated in West Germany.

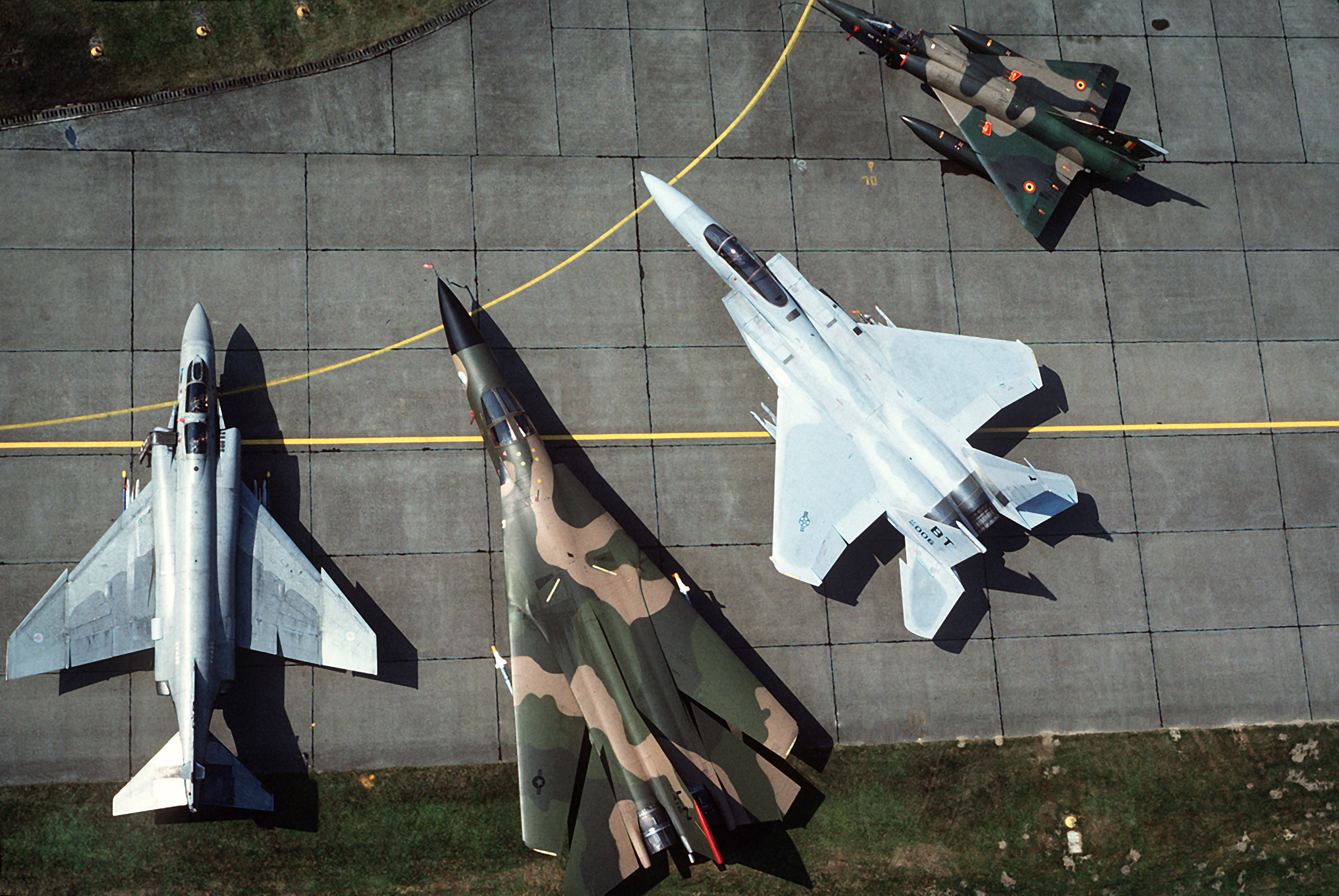
Nuclear-capable aircraft at Kleine Brogel Air Base, 1984: A British F-4 Phantom II, a US F-111 Aardvark, a US F-15 Eagle and a Belgian Mirage 5.

Of the three nuclear powers in NATO (France, the United Kingdom and the United States), only the United States is known to have provided weapons for nuclear sharing. However, the UK also deployed, stationed, or tested nuclear weapons on the territory of West Germany, Singapore, and the Akrotiri and Dhekelia overseas territory on the island of Cyprus. France tested nuclear weapons on the territory of Algeria, then a colony. The United States began moving weapons to Europe in 1954, first to the UK, and then to West Germany. The US negotiated agreements with the Allied countries where US nuclear weapons would be stored, including Section 144b of the Atomic Energy Act, and a national stockpile agreement. It also negotiated additional agreements with France, West Germany, Belgium, Netherlands, Canada, and the UK for the use of nuclear weapons stored and controlled by US forces in West Germany. These arrangements included delivery of short-range nuclear weapons - including landmines, rockets, and artillery, as well as nuclear armed depth charges and anti-aircraft missiles. The US also negotiated a separate agreement with Canada to provide nuclear-armed anti-air and anti-ship weapons to defend North America. The US deployed nuclear forces in Greenland (Danish territory) and Iceland - as well as extensively in East Asia: Japan, South Korea, Taiwan, the Philippines, but these were solely for delivery by US troops.

Historically, the shared nuclear weapon delivery systems were not restricted to bombs. Greece used Nike-Hercules Missiles as well as A-7 Corsair II attack aircraft. Canada had Bomarc nuclear-armed anti-aircraft missiles, Honest John surface-to-surface missiles and the AIR-2 Genie nuclear-armed air-to-air rocket, as well as tactical nuclear bombs for the CF-104 fighter. PGM-19 Jupiter medium-range ballistic missiles were shared with Italian air force units and Turkish units with US dual key systems to enable the warheads. PGM-17 Thor intermediate-range ballistic missiles were forward deployed to the UK with RAF crews. An extended version of nuclear sharing, the NATO Multilateral Force was a plan to equip NATO surface ships of the member states with UGM-27 Polaris missiles, but the UK ended up purchasing the Polaris missiles and using its own warheads, and the plan to equip NATO surface ships was abandoned. In the later Cold War, the deployment of US Pershing II and Soviet RSD-10 Pioneer medium-range ballistic missiles to Europe resulted in the "Euromissile Crisis" including the 1979 NATO Double-Track Decision.

Canada hosted weapons under the control of the North American Aerospace Defense Command (NORAD), rather than NATO, until 1984, and Greece until 2001. The United Kingdom also received US tactical nuclear weapons such as nuclear artillery and Lance missiles until 1992, even though the UK is a nuclear-weapon state in its own right; these were mainly deployed in West Germany.

After the Soviet Union collapsed, the nuclear weapon types shared within NATO were reduced to tactical nuclear bombs deployed by Dual-Capable Aircraft (DCA), i.e. aircraft capable of carrying conventional or nuclear weapons. According to the press, Eastern European member states of NATO have resisted the withdrawal of the shared nuclear bombs from Europe, fearing it would show a weakening of US commitment to defend Europe against Russia.

==== Weapon types ====
- Current:
  - B61 nuclear bomb (Belgium, Germany, Italy, Netherlands, and Turkey)
- Former:
  - AIR-2 Genie (Canada)
  - B57 nuclear bomb (Canada, United Kingdom, and West Germany)
  - B28 nuclear bomb (Canada, and the United Kingdom)
  - B43 nuclear bomb (Canada, United Kingdom)
  - B61 nuclear bomb (Greece)
  - BGM-109G Ground Launched Cruise Missile (Belgium, Italy, Netherlands, United Kingdom, and West Germany)
  - CIM-10 Bomarc (Canada)
  - Mark 7 nuclear bomb (United Kingdom)
  - Mk 101 Lulu (Netherlands and the United Kingdom)
  - MGR-1 Honest John (Belgium, Canada, Greece, Italy, Netherlands, Turkey, United Kingdom, and West Germany)
  - MGM-1 Matador (West Germany)
  - MGM-5 Corporal (United Kingdom)
  - MGM-29 Sergeant (West Germany)
  - MGM-52 Lance (Belgium, Italy, Netherlands, United Kingdom, and West Germany)
  - MIM-14 Nike Hercules (Belgium, Greece, Italy, Netherlands, Turkey, and West Germany)
  - Pershing 1 (West Germany)
  - Pershing 1a (West Germany)
  - PGM-17 Thor (United Kingdom)
  - PGM-19 Jupiter (Italy and Turkey)
  - UGM-27 Polaris (Italy)
  - W33 and W48 Artillery Shells (Canada, Belgium, Greece, Italy, Netherlands, Turkey, United Kingdom, and West Germany)

=== Dual Capable Aircraft ===
United States Weapons Storage and Security Systems in Europe
Country	Base	Estimated weapons	Air group assigned	Dual-capable aircraft at base
Belgium	Kleine Brogel	10–15	(Belgium) 10th Tactical Wing	General Dynamics F-16AM/BM Fighting Falcon
Germany	Büchel	10–15	(Germany) Taktisches Luftwaffengeschwader 33	Panavia PA-200 Tornado IDS
Greece	Araxos	0 (reserve mission only)	(Greece) 116th Combat Wing	General Dynamics F-16C/D Fighting Falcon
Italy	Aviano	20–30	(United States) 31st Fighter Wing	General Dynamics F-16C/D Fighting Falcon
Italy	Ghedi	10–15	(Italy) 6° Stormo	Lockheed Martin F-35A Lightning II Panavia PA-200 Tornado IDS
Netherlands	Volkel	10–15	(Netherlands) Air Combat Command	Lockheed Martin F-35A Lightning II
Turkey	Incirlik	20–30	None assigned	General Dynamics F-16C/D Fighting Falcon
United Kingdom	Lakenheath	25-30	(United States) 48th Fighter Wing	Lockheed Martin F-35A Lightning II McDonnell Douglas F-15E Strike Eagle
Total		125-130		

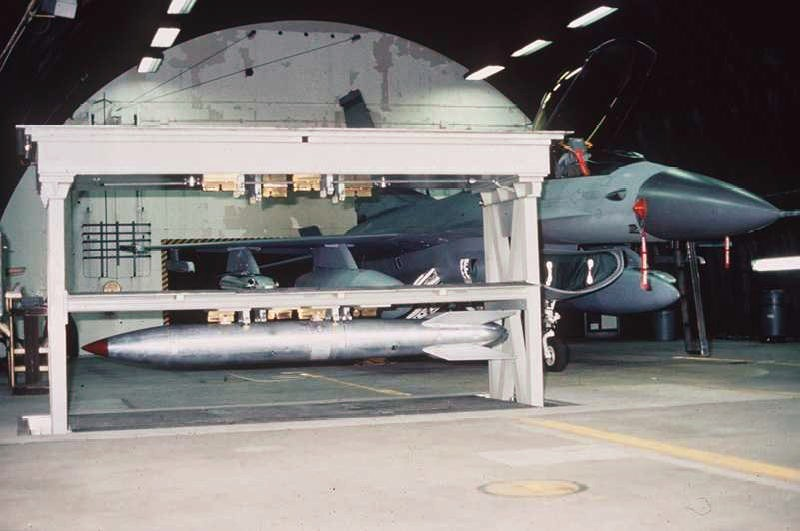
Typical NATO airbase arrangement. A Weapons Storage and Security System holding a B61 nuclear bomb, with an F-16 Fighting Falcon dual-capable aircraft.

As of 2025, Belgium, Germany, Italy, the Netherlands, Turkey, and the United Kingdom have been hosting US nuclear weapons as part of NATO's nuclear sharing policy. They are assigned to delivery by specific US and European aircraft wings, operating NATO-designated dual-capable aircraft.

In peacetime, the nuclear weapons stored in non-nuclear countries are guarded by United States Air Force (USAF) personnel and previously, some nuclear artillery and missile systems were guarded by United States Army (USA) personnel; the permissive action link codes required for arming them remain under American control. In case of war, the weapons are to be mounted on the participating countries' warplanes. The weapons are under custody and control of USAF Munitions Support Squadrons co-located on NATO main operating bases who work together with the host nation forces.

As of 2025, 125 to 130 tactical B61 nuclear bombs are believed to be deployed in Europe under the nuclear sharing arrangement. The weapons are stored within a vault in hardened aircraft shelters, using the USAF WS3 Weapon Storage and Security System. European air forces operate General Dynamics F-16 Fighting Falcons (F-16s) and Panavia Tornados Interdictor/Strike (PA-200s), and are in the process of transitioning to Lockheed Martin F-35A Lightnings II (F-35As). United States Air Forces in Europe operates F-16s at Aviano, Italy, and both F-35As and McDonnell Douglas F-15E Strike Eagles (F-15Es) at Lakenheath, UK. F-35As only operate under the USAF from RAF Lakenheath. The use of stockpiled American B61s in Europe, via the DCA programme, is claimed to require authorization from the NATO Nuclear Planning Group and Prime Minister of the United Kingdom, in addition to the US president.

==== Belgium ====
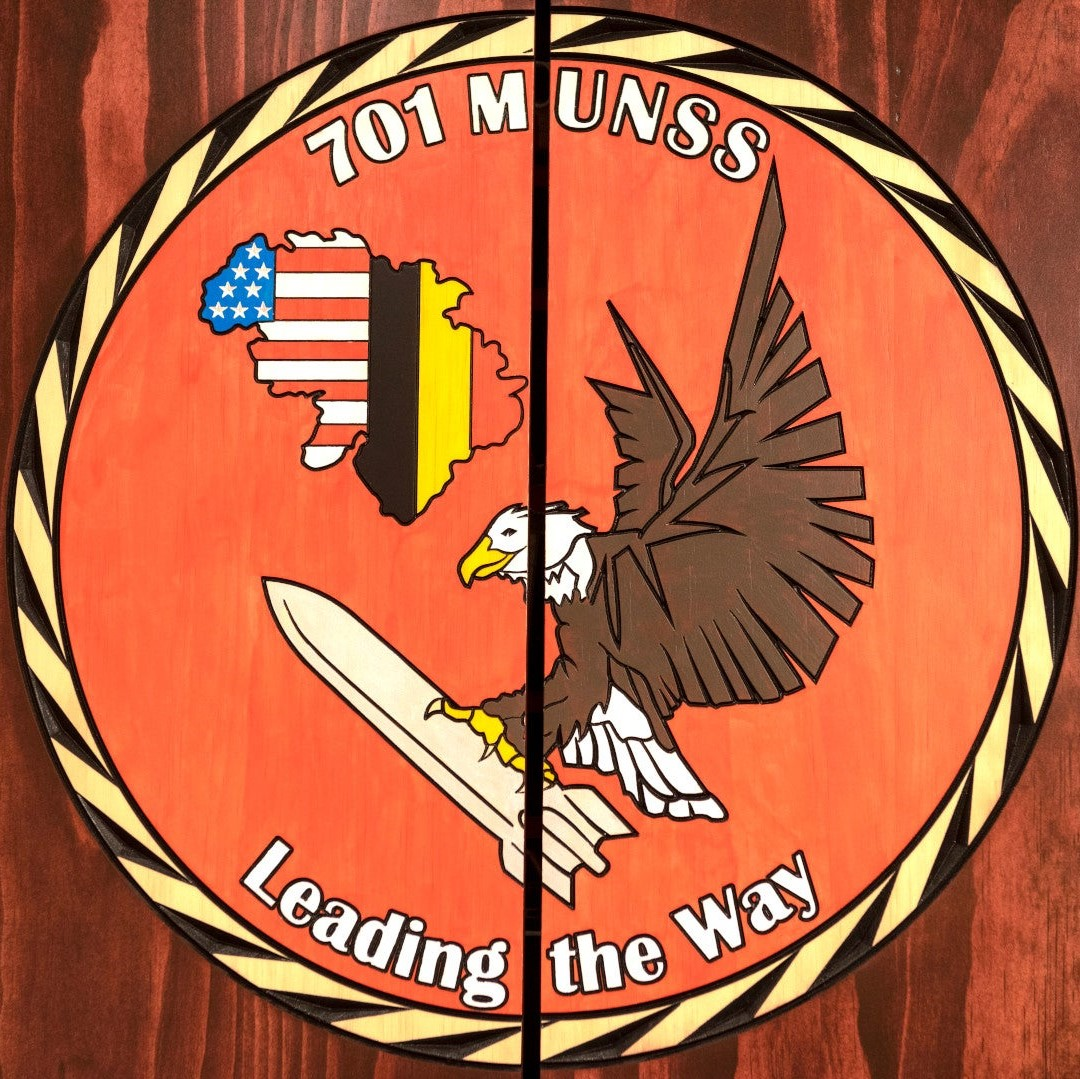
Unit insignia of the 701st MUNSS, with custody of United States nuclear weapons stored in Belgium. The weapon casing resembles the withdrawn B83 nuclear bomb.

The United States has stationed nuclear weapons in the Kingdom of Belgium since 1963. As of 2023, an estimated 10 to 15 B61 nuclear bombs are stored at Kleine Brogel Air Base, maintained by USAFE's 701st Munitions Support Squadron and designated for the usage of the Belgian 10th Tactical Wing, flying their F-16 MLU fighter jets.

==== Italy ====
In Italy, B61 bombs are stored at the Ghedi Air Base and at the Aviano Air Base. According to the former Italian President Francesco Cossiga, Italy's role in a planned retaliation consisted in striking with those nuclear weapons Czechoslovakia and Hungary had the Warsaw Pact waged nuclear war against NATO. He acknowledged the presence of US nuclear weapons in Italy, and speculated about the possible presence of British and French nuclear weapons.

==== Germany ====
The only German nuclear base is located in Büchel Air Base, near the border with Luxembourg. The base has 11 Protective Aircraft Shelters (PAS) equipped with WS3 Vaults for storage of nuclear weapons, each with a maximum capacity of 44 B61 nuclear bombs. There are 20 B61 bombs stored on the base for delivery by German PA-200 Tornado IDS bombers of the JaBoG 33 squadron. The Tornado IDS aircraft were due to be retired by the end of 2024; while 2010 and 2018 assessments questioned what nuclear sharing role, if any, Germany would then retain, in 2020 Germany (Fourth Merkel cabinet) announced that it would buy 30 Boeing F/A-18E/F Super Hornets to replace the Tornado in its nuclear-capable role. The Super Hornet was not yet certified for the B61 bomb, but Dan Gillian, head of Boeing's Super Hornet program, had previously stated his optimism about achieving this certification in a timely manner. In 2022, against the backdrop of the Russian invasion of Ukraine, the Super Hornet order was cancelled and Germany (Kabinett Scholz) instead chose to order 35 Lockheed Martin F-35 jets for nuclear sharing use.

==== Netherlands ====
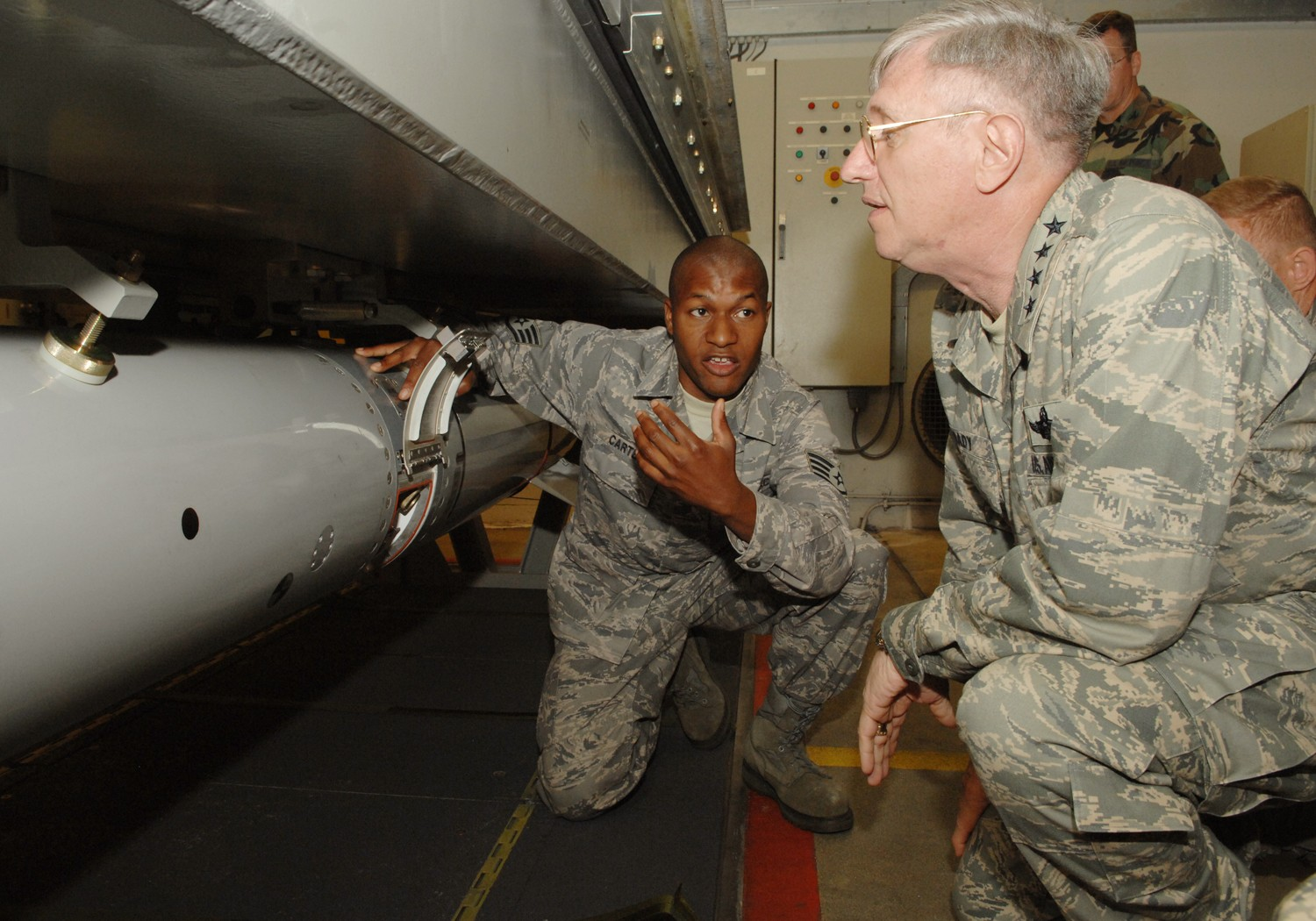
A US nuclear weapon storage system at Volkel Air Base to store weapons for delivery by Royal Netherlands Air Force F-16s, being shown to General Roger Brady in June 2008

B61 bombs are stored at Volkel Air Base in the Netherlands, for delivery by F-35A fighters. An estimated 10 to 15 bombs are stored as of 2023. The F-35 took over the Netherlands' nuclear strike role from the F-16 on 1 June 2024, becoming the first European NATO member to operate a stealth aircraft for a nuclear role.

On 10 June 2013, former Dutch prime minister Ruud Lubbers confirmed the existence of 22 shared nuclear bombs at Volkel Air Base. This was inadvertently confirmed again in June 2019 when a public draft report to the NATO Parliamentary Assembly was discovered to reference the existence of US nuclear weapons at Volkel, as well as locations in Belgium, Italy, Germany, and Turkey. A new version of the report was released on 11 July 2019 without reference to the locations of the weapons.

==== Turkey ====
In 2017, due to an increasingly unstable relationship between the United States and Turkey it was suggested that the United States consider removing 50 tactical nuclear weapons stored under American control at the Incirlik Air Base in Turkey. The presence of US nuclear weapons in Turkey gained increased public attention in October 2019 with the deterioration of relations between the two nations after the Turkish military incursion into Syria.

==== United Kingdom ====
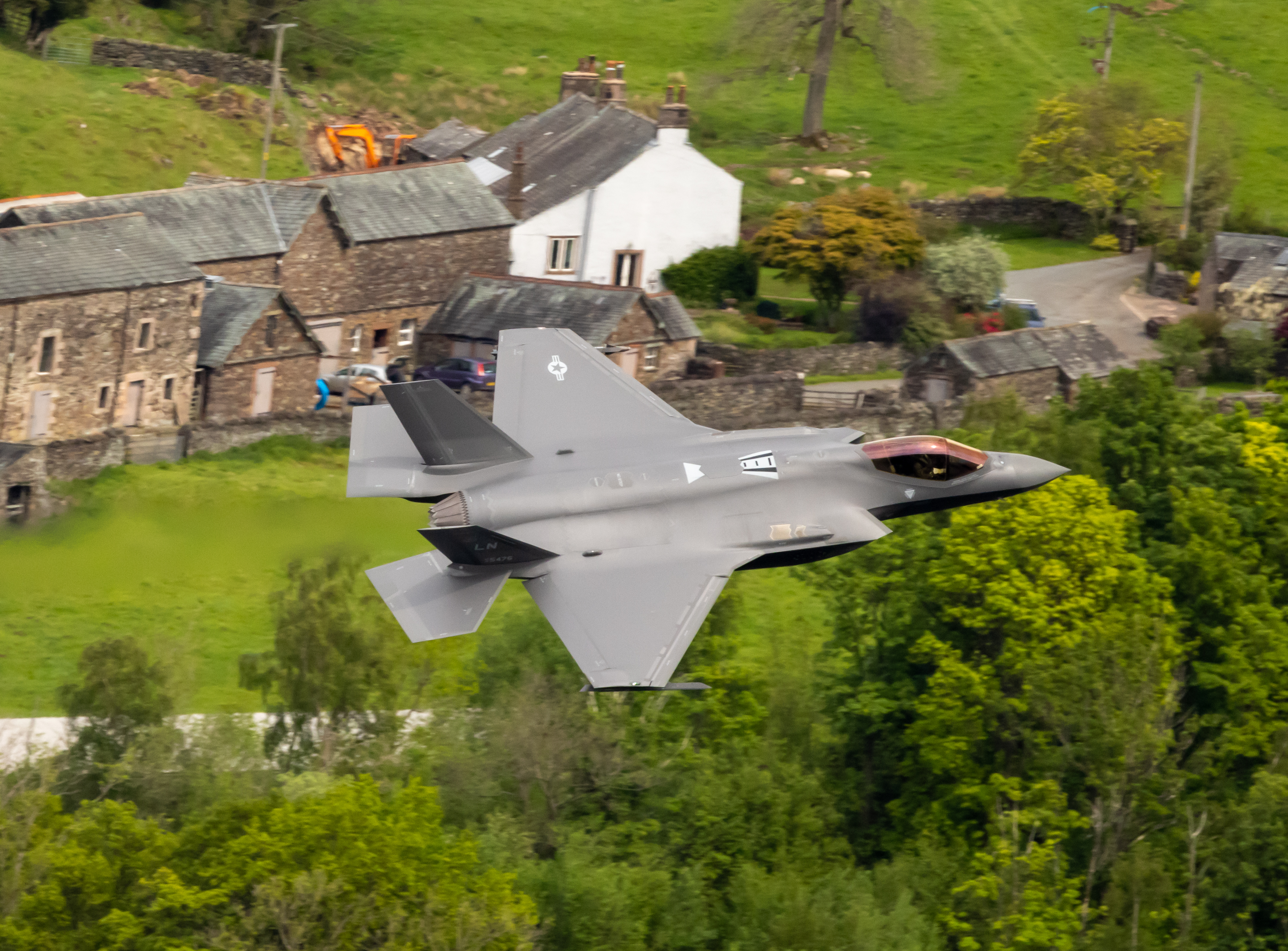
A United States Air Force F-35A flying out of RAF Lakenheath, UK.

In July 2025, experts concluded that between 25 and 30 United States nuclear weapons had been redeployed to RAF Lakenheath for the first time since 2008. This was based on telemetry from a 15 July Boeing C-17 Globemaster III flight between New Mexico and the United Kingdom, as well as preparations for nuclear weapons storage at the base being documented since 2023. The US and UK defense departments reiterated their policy to not confirm or deny nuclear weapon presence. The weapons can be delivered by both F-35A and F-15E aircraft, it is the second nuclear base in Europe to host F-35As, after Volkel Air Base, and the only one to host F-15Es. An October 2025 Federation of American Scientists report argued US nuclear weapons may not be present at Lakenheath, as it might first be required to complete base security fences and command posts, expected to take until 2031.

RAF Marham is also expected to have upgrades completed in the early 2030s at a former US nuclear base, although it will host a Royal Air Force wing of F-35As. A parliamentary inquiry questioned the change to the country's nuclear posture and the issue of US control of the weapons, with inquiring MP Tan Dhesi calling it the "UK’s most significant defence expansion since the cold war".

==== Polish aspirations ====
In 2022, after the Russian invasion of Ukraine, reports appeared about the possible inclusion of Poland in the nuclear sharing policy, with then-president Andrzej Duda calling the country's lack of nuclear weapons a "problem" and saying that it was in talks with the United States about the possibility of nuclear sharing. In June 2023, then-prime minister Mateusz Morawiecki declared Poland's interest in hosting nuclear weapons under the policy, citing the reported deployment of Russian nuclear weapons to its Kaliningrad region and Belarus, while National Security Bureau head Jacek Siewiera said the country was interested in certifying its upcoming F-35A fleet as being capable of delivering B61 bombs.

In April 2024, president Duda said that Poland was "ready" to host nuclear weapons and had been discussing the matter with the United States government for "some time". The new Polish prime minister, Donald Tusk, said that he wanted to speak with Duda to understand the intention behind the statement and that he wanted Poland to "be safe and well-armed, but [he] would also like any initiatives to be very well prepared by the people responsible for them and for all [Poles] to be convinced that this is what [they] want." In May 2024, foreign minister Radosław Sikorski accused president Duda of failing to consult with him on this and other major foreign policy announcements and said that he had "asked the president privately and publicly not to discuss such delicate and secret matters in public, because it [did] not help Poland"; he also said that the previous Polish government had been told that the idea of Poland being involved with nuclear sharing was "not on the table".

After the announcement in March 2025 that France was considering the extension of its nuclear deterrence to other European countries (see next section), president Duda welcomed this development while simultaneously renewing his call for American weapons to be based in Poland.

In August 2026, deputy defence minister Paweł Zalewski said that, while Poland wanted to participate in NATO nuclear deterrence, it did not want nuclear weapons on its territory. He later clarified that Poland had the opportunity to take part in NATO's dual-capable aircraft program. The defence minister, Władysław Kosiniak-Kamysz, later said that Poland remained interested in NATO nuclear sharing and in a potential European nuclear umbrella, but did not address the issue of stationing weapons in Poland. Zalewski's comments were criticised by opposition politicians, including Marcin Przydacz (senior foreign policy aide to the new Polish president Karol Nawrocki) and Morawiecki-era defence minister Mariusz Błaszczak, as well as retired brigadier general Stanisław Koziej.

=== Sharing of non-US weapons ===
In March 2025, amid European concerns over whether the United States could continue to be relied on as an ally, the French president Emmanuel Macron said that his country would consider the possibility of extending the protection offered by its nuclear arsenal to other European states. Both Macron and defence minister Sébastien Lecornu stressed that ultimate control over the weapons would be retained by France, and claims that the potential decision amounted to a plan for nuclear sharing were explicitly denied. Friedrich Merz said that discussions on nuclear sharing should be held with France and Britain (which also has nuclear weapons) but warned that European weapons could only ever be a supplement to the existing American arrangement.

=== NATO Nuclear Policy ===
NATO's official nuclear policy states that "The fundamental purpose of NATO's nuclear capability is to preserve peace, prevent coercion and deter aggression."

==== Conventional Support for Nuclear Operations ====
CSNO (Conventional Support for Nuclear Operations), formerly called SNOWCAT (Support for Nuclear Operations with Conventional Air Tactics) is a program for NATO members to provide conventional military assets to support nuclear strike missions. This includes via escort fighters and suppression of enemy air defenses. Its exact participants are unknown, but as of 2023 it includes Czechia, Denmark, Hungary, Poland, the United Kingdom, and two unknown states. In April 2023, the Finnish Ministry of Defence announced that the country "could join support functions for NATO nuclear operations outside its own territory", which was interpreted as suggesting SNOWCAT participation.

==== Decentralization ====
The British think tank Chatham House has noted NATO does not directly possess nuclear weapons as the three nuclear states maintain "absolute custody".

A 2019 NATO speech emphasized the role of the strategic nuclear forces of the three nuclear-armed members: "Should an adversary decide to attack NATO, they must not only contend with NATO’s decision-making processes, but also the decision-making processes in Washington, London and Paris."

Deterrence scholars have argued that prior to the introduction permissive action links and the consequent end of "substantive nuclear sharing", NATO attempted deterrence via the threat of fully independent NATO command decision-making on the employment of forward-deployed nuclear weapons in Europe. The Supreme Allied Commander Europe, Lauris Norstad said in the late 1950s NATO was intended as a "fourth nuclear power" alongside the US, USSR, and UK.

==== Alliance management ====
Leiden University scholar Linde Desmaele has argued that US nuclear weapons in Europe, and participation in conventional support for nuclear operations, are "primarily tools of alliance management" and their main purposes are:

- Deflection: Providing a relatively low-cost way for European allies to maintain their alliance standing;
- Legitimation: Unifying allies in support of nuclear deterrence and in not joining to the Treaty on the Prohibition of Nuclear Weapons; and
- Consultation: Giving non-nuclear allies more insight and influence over US nuclear deterrence policy and anchoring the United States to NATO and the European continent.

== Non-NATO ==
=== USSR ===
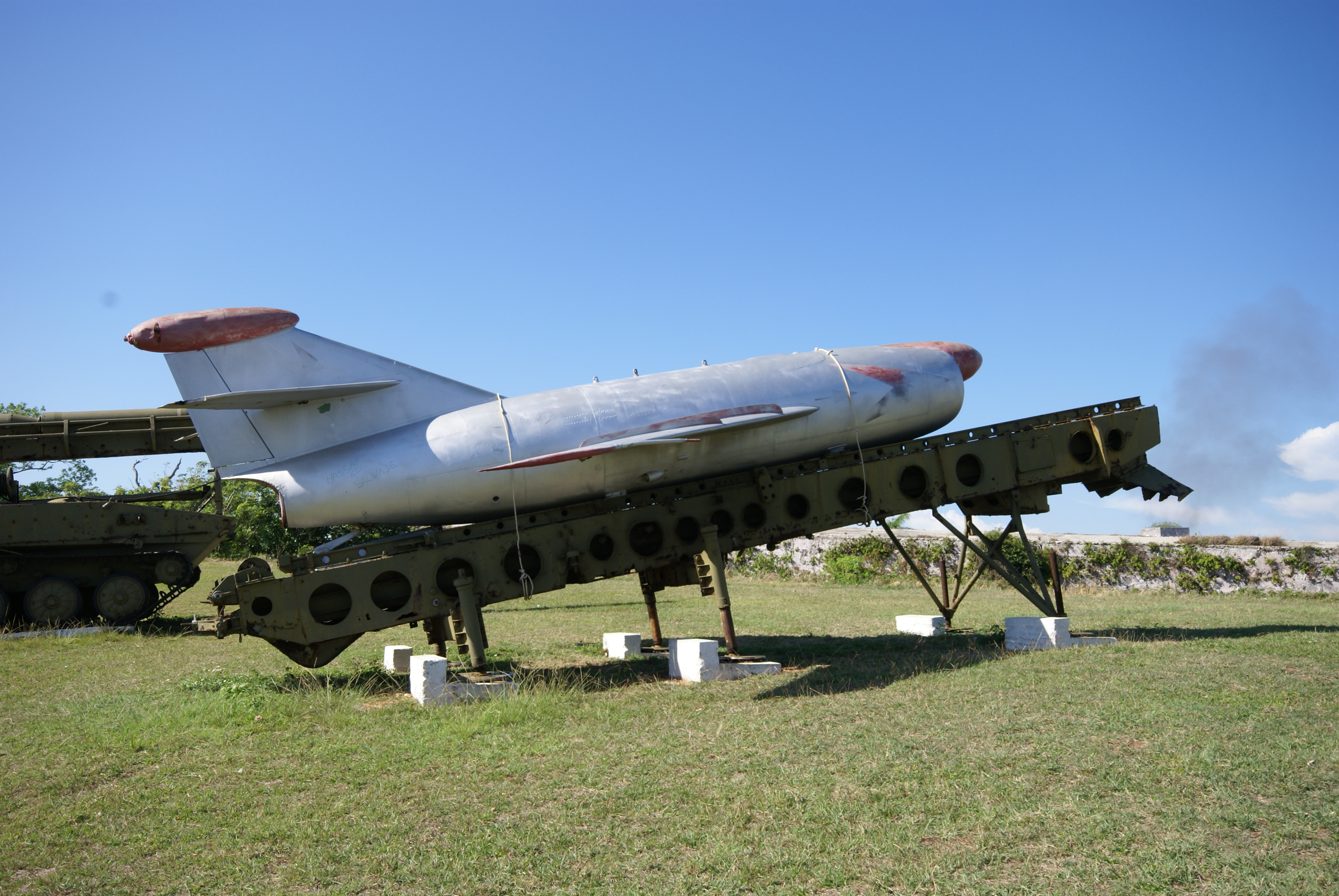
An FKR-1 nuclear cruise missile, one of the Soviet nuclear weapons deployed to Cuba during the 1962 Cuban Missile Crisis.

The Soviet Union practiced nuclear stationing during the Cold War, primarily with Warsaw Pact countries. It stationed nuclear weapons in East Germany, Czechoslovakia, Hungary, Poland, and Mongolia, as well as briefly in Cuba during the 1962 Cuban Missile Crisis. It is possible that similar arrangements were made with Bulgaria, but no sources have been found to date. In 1963, in the wake of the Cuban Missile Crisis, the Socialist Republic of Romania made a secret declaration to the United States that it did not host Soviet nuclear weapons, and that it would wish to remain neutral rather than uphold its Warsaw Pact obligations in the event of a superpower conflict.

Some historical evidence indicates during the 1973 Yom Kippur War, the Soviet Union deployed nuclear weapons to Egypt, including possibly providing two warheads to Soviet Scud missile brigades, as well as the typical nuclear weapons stored on ships and submarines of the 5th Operational Squadron based in Syria.

=== Russian sharing with Belarus ===
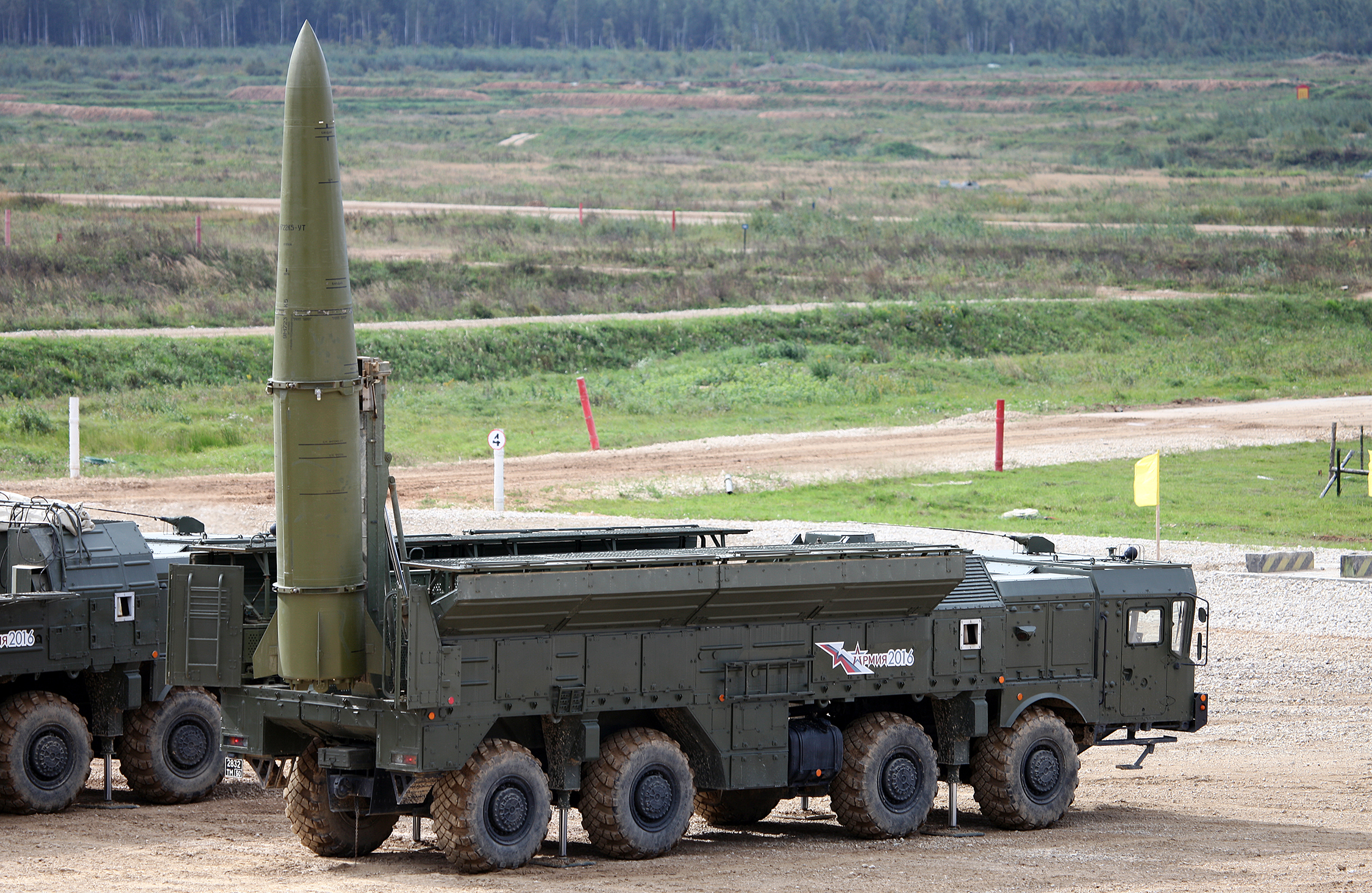
The Russian Iskander-M nuclear-capable short-range ballistic missile was deployed to Belarus in 2022.

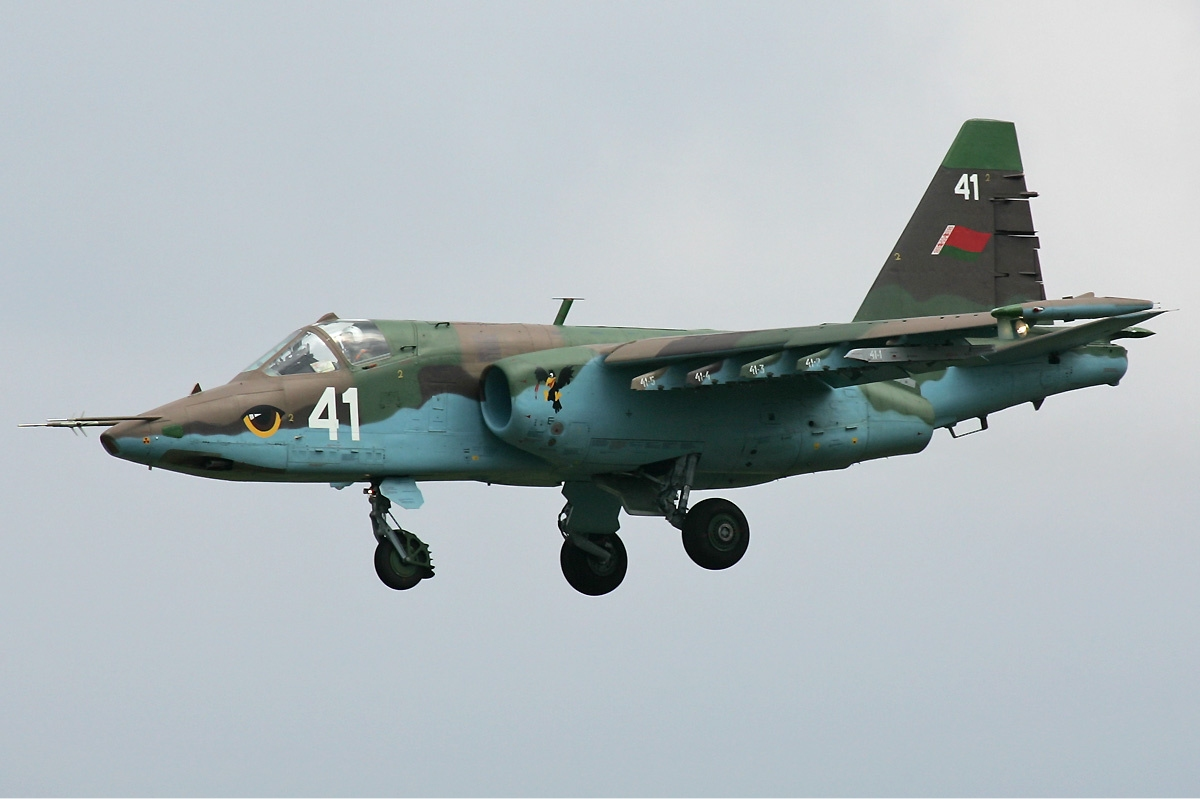
A Belarusian Air Force Sukhoi Su-25. It is believed that since 2023 some Su-25s are modified and crews trained for deploying Russian tactical nuclear weapons.

On 27 February 2022, shortly after the 2022 Russian invasion of Ukraine, Belarusians voted in a constitutional referendum with political and military reforms, including to repeal the post-Soviet constitutional prohibition on basing of nuclear weapons. The reforms also removed the country's neutral status and allowed permanent basing for the Russian Armed Forces. The referendum was criticized by the EU, UK, US, Canada, and other countries in the context of the censorship and human rights violations against the Belarusian opposition.

At a meeting on 25 June 2022, Russian President Vladimir Putin and President of Belarus Alexander Lukashenko agreed the deployment of Russian short-range nuclear-capable missiles. Lukashenko has described the weapons as "non-strategic". Russia supplied Belarus with nuclear-capable Iskander-M missile systems in 2023, with President Putin announcing the first delivery of warheads occurring as of 16 June 2023 in a speech at the St. Petersburg International Forum. These missile warheads are believed to have a variable yield between 5 and 50 kilotons. Additionally, Russia has completed modifications necessary for Belarusian Su-25 bombers to carry nuclear air-dropped bombs and the pilots have received training. The yield of these bombs is not believed to exceed 20 kilotons. Belarus has reported full operation of the nuclear-capable Iskanders and Su-25s, and exercised their use with training nuclear warheads in May 2024.

As of 2025, there is no conclusive open-source evidence that Russian nuclear warheads and gravity bombs themselves are being stored in Belarus, although the most likely location if so is a Cold War-era depot near Asipovichy. In December 2024, Lukashenko stated Belarus was hosting "dozens" of Russian warheads. Putin has also stated that its Oreshnik, an intermediate-range ballistic missile, could be deployed to Belarus in the second half of 2025, and that Belarus would play a role in nuclear targeting.

Despite Lukashenko's statement on weapon usage "without hesitation in case of aggression against Belarus", which could indicate the transfer of operational control to Belarus, Putin emphasized Russian control was maintained, and General Secretary of the CIS Sergey Lebedev described a "double nuclear button" for weapon usage.

=== Potential Pakistani sharing with Saudi Arabia ===
It was common belief among foreign officials in 2010 that Saudi Arabia and Pakistan have an understanding in which Pakistan would supply Saudi Arabia with warheads if security in the Persian Gulf was threatened. A Western official told The Times that Saudi Arabia could have the nuclear warheads in a matter of days of approaching Pakistan. Pakistan's ambassador to Saudi Arabia, Muhammed Naeem Khan, was quoted as saying, "Pakistan considers the security of Saudi Arabia not just as a diplomatic or an internal matter but as a personal matter." Naeem also said that the Saudi leadership considered Pakistan and Saudi Arabia to be one country and that any threat to Saudi Arabia is also a threat to Pakistan. Western intelligence sources told The Guardian that "the Saudi monarchy paid for up to 60% of the Pakistani nuclear programme, and in return has the option to buy a small nuclear arsenal ('five to six warheads') off the shelf". Saudi Arabia has potential dual-purpose delivery infrastructure, including Tornado IDS and F-15S fighter bombers and improved Chinese CSS-2 intermediate range ballistic missiles with accuracy sufficient for nuclear warheads but delivered with high explosive warheads.

In November 2013, a variety of sources told BBC Newsnight that Saudi Arabia was able to obtain nuclear weapons from Pakistan at will. The report further alleged, according to western experts, that Pakistan's defense sector had received plentiful financial assistance from Saudi Arabia. Gary Samore, an adviser to Barack Obama, said, "I do think that the Saudis believe that they have some understanding with Pakistan that, in extremis, they would have claim to acquire nuclear weapons from Pakistan." Amos Yadlin, formerly head of Israeli military intelligence, said "They already paid for the bomb, they will go to Pakistan and bring what they need to bring."

According to the US-based Center for Strategic and International Studies think-thank, the BBC's report on possible Pakistani-Saudi nuclear sharing was partially incorrect. There was no indication of the validity or credibility of the BBC's sources, and the article failed to expand on what was essentially an unverified lead. Furthermore, if Pakistan were to transfer nuclear warheads onto Saudi soil, it was highly unlikely that either nation would face any international repercussions if NATO-esque guidelines were followed. A research paper produced by the British House of Commons Defence Select Committee states that as long as current NATO nuclear sharing arrangements remain in place, the NATO states would have few valid grounds for complaint if such a transfer were to occur.

On 17 September 2025, Pakistan and Saudi Arabia signed the Strategic Mutual Defence Agreement, a week after the Israeli airstrike in Qatar added to long-running concerns about US unpredictability and commitment to Gulf states defence. The agreement states an attack on one country will be treated as an attack on both. A senior Saudi official told Reuters, regarding whether Pakistan would provide Saudi Arabia with a nuclear umbrella, "This is a comprehensive defensive agreement that encompasses all military means." Pakistani Defense Minister Khawaja Asif initially suggested that the strategic agreement with Saudi Arabia might involve a nuclear element but later backtracked, stating that such a scope was not included. The ambiguity surrounding his remarks fueled speculation about the pact's implications, with its precise terms remaining unclear. Ali Shihabi, a Saudi commentator with close ties to the monarchy, welcomed the “deterrence that comes from sharing Pakistan’s nuclear umbrella.”

== Nuclear Non-Proliferation Treaty considerations ==
In 2015, Russia accused the US of violating the NPT, but since Russia resumed its own nuclear sharing arrangements, now with Belarus, it no longer makes this assertion. However, China accused the US of violating the NPT at a side event to the NPT review process in Geneva in July 2024.

At the time the NPT was being negotiated, the NATO nuclear sharing agreements were well known and discussed publicly in the United Nations at the NPT negotiations in Geneva, national parliaments, NATO and government press releases, and in the news media. The US and USSR discussed the wording of Articles I and II at length bilaterally and negotiated the wording to ensure that they were compatible with the NPT during an especially intense negotiation from 22 to 30 October 1966 on the sidelines of the UN General Assembly in New York. While some have erroneously claimed that such arrangements were secret or unknown, and that some signatories not have known about these agreements and interpretations at that time, these claims have been thoroughly debunked.

== Sharing of other weapons of mass destruction ==
During the Cold War militarization of the Iron Curtain region of Europe, the US and Soviet arsenals of chemical weapons played an intertwined role with nuclear sharing.

The United States stationed chemical weapons at its overseas military bases, in Okinawa until 1972 and in West Germany, until 1990. The Soviet Union likely stationed chemical weapons in East Germany, Czechoslovakia, and Poland, based on post-Cold War evidence, but repeatedly denied this. Both sides developed a large arsenal of ground and air delivery systems: shells, mines, rockets, longer-range missiles, spray tanks, and many others.

In 1969, the Nixon administration proclaimed a policy of no-first-use of chemical weapons, but maintained its chemical arsenal as a deterrent to Soviet first use in Europe. British intelligence concluded that Warsaw Pact battle plans included a massive surprise battlefield attack with chemical weapons, intended to maximize casualties and cause demoralization.

A 1984 RAND report argued that Soviet forces viewed chemical weapons usage as a matter of tactical advantages and disadvantages, and not as especially escalatory. In this vein, Soviet forces may be more likely to strike the rear than the frontline: threatening rendering NATO nuclear airbases in Europe inoperable with chemical attacks, including persistent chemical weapons, a fear which contributed to the development of the Weapons Storage and Security System for nuclear weapons at the bases. It also argued NATO would not be willing to respond to a Soviet chemical first use with nuclear weapons.

== See also ==
- US–UK Mutual Defence Agreement
- United States military deployments around the world
- United States nuclear weapons in Japan
- Taiwan and weapons of mass destruction
