= Büchel Air Base =

Military air base in Germany

Büchel Air Base Fliegerhorst Büchel
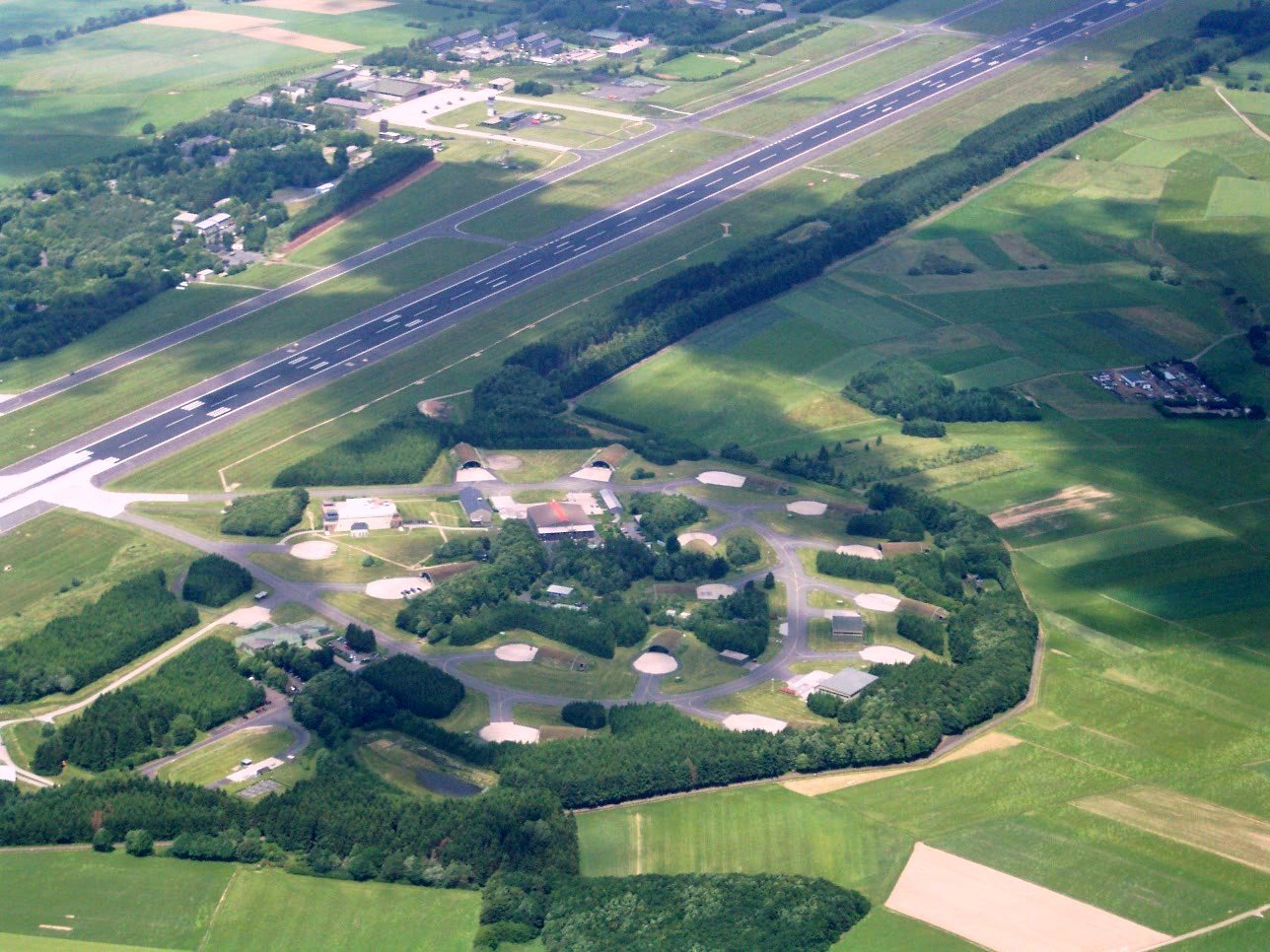
- IATA: none; ICAO: ETSB

Summary
- Airport type: Military
- Operator: German Air Force
- Location: Büchel, Rhineland-Palatinate
- Elevation AMSL: 1,568 ft / 478 m
- Coordinates: 50°10′35″N 007°03′28″E
- Website: Luftgeschwader 33
- Interactive map of Büchel Air Base

Runways
Direction	Length		Surface
Direction	ft	m	Surface
03/21	8,225	2,507	Asphalt

Büchel Air Base is a military air base of the Luftwaffe in Büchel (Germany), near the city of Cochem and at about 70 km from Spangdahlem Air Base. It is home to the Taktisches Luftwaffengeschwader 33 (Tactical Air Force Wing 33; abbreviated as: TaktLwG 33) (formerly Jagdbombergeschwader 33 or Fighter Bomber Wing 33) of the German Air Force (Luftwaffe) and the 702 Munitions Support Squadron (702 MUNSS) of the United States Air Force (USAF). Since 1985, tactical Air Force Wing 33 has been operating German Panavia Tornado airplanes, which can deliver twenty B61 nuclear bombs, the only remaining nuclear weapons in Germany. As of 2023, Büchel was one of six active air bases in five European countries with B61 nuclear bombs in underground WS3 Weapon Storage and Security System inside aircraft shelters, per nuclear sharing. Since 1996 there have been annual protests and over one hundred activists have been sentenced for nonviolent protest.

== History ==
Büchel Air Base formerly was the home of the 7501 MUNSS.

Since 1985, Taktisches Luftwaffengeschwader 33 tactical Air Force Wing 33 has been operating German Panavia Tornado airplanes, which are capable of delivering the twenty B61 nuclear bombs, which are stored and maintained by the 702 Munitions Support Squadron (702 MUNSS) of the United States Air Force (USAF). Under the NATO nuclear sharing arrangement, these twenty B61 bombs are secured and maintained by USAF personnel.

In 1995, five German airbases had nuclear weapons: Büchel, Memmingen, Norvenich, Ramstein and Spangdahlem; Since nuclear weapons were removed from Ramstein in 2007, Büchel air base has been the only location in Germany with nuclear weapons. Up until 1996, many local politicians did not know about the nuclear weapons.

In 2009, a coalition agreement between CDU and FDP at the initiative of foreign minister Guido Westerwelle, contained the withdrawal of nuclear weapons as a goal, reaffirmed by the Bundestag in 2010.

According to the Guardian in 2013, Eastern European member states of NATO have resisted the withdrawal of the shared nuclear bombs from Europe, fearing it would show a weakening of the U.S. commitment to defend Europe against Russia.

In 2020, Rolf Mützenich, SPD opposed nuclear sharing and the then imminent replacement of the B61-3 and B61-4 nuclear warheads, which have been stationed in Büchel, with the latest B61-12 models. In 2022, with the 2022 Russian invasion of Ukraine a majority of Germans in a poll were in favor of keeping nuclear weapons in Germany. As of 2023, the Federal Ministry of Defence (Germany) said it planned to have converted the airfield by 2026 to accommodate the new F-35, at a cost of €10 billion. In the interim the Bundeswehr is training at Nörvenich Air Base.

== Size and weapon systems ==
As of 2022, the air base consisted of 2,000 military and civilian members, specialized in close air support working with 46 Panavia Tornado airplanes.

== Peace protests ==
In June 1996 annual peace protests began. As of 2021, 96 activists had since been sentenced for civil disobedience and trespassing. One peace activist named Rüdiger Lancelle, a former teacher, has been protesting every week since 2002 "that the weapons lying in Büchel get removed and be scrapped". There are traditional annual peace protests at Easter by numerous groups, including the International Campaign to Abolish Nuclear Weapons.

In June 2024, three nonviolent protesters were sentenced for trespassing and went to prison for nonpayment of financial penalties, among them the first ever female U.S. citizen.

== See also ==
- Spangdahlem Air Base

Air bases with US nuclear weapon vaults in Europe per nuclear sharing:

- Aviano Air Base, Italy
- Ghedi Air Base, Italy
- Kleine Brogel Air Base, Belgium
- Volkel Air Base, Netherlands
- Ramstein Air Base, Germany
- RAF Lakenheath, United Kingdom
- Araxos Air Base, Greece

Air bases with US nuclear weapon vaults in Turkey per nuclear sharing:

- Balikesir Air Base, Turkey
- Incirlik Air Base, Turkey
- Akıncı Air Base, Turkey
