= Netherlands and weapons of mass destruction =

Netherlands
- Nuclear weapons stationing start date: 1960; 66 years ago
- Nuclear weapons stationing provider: United States
- Current nuclear weapons stationed: 10–22 warheads

Although the Netherlands does not have weapons of mass destruction made by itself, the country participates in NATO's nuclear weapons sharing arrangements and trains for delivering US nuclear weapons. These weapons were first stored in the Netherlands in 1960.

The Netherlands is also one of the producers of components that can be used for creating deadly agents, chemical weapons and other kinds of weapons of mass destruction. Several Dutch companies provided the United States, Israel and Pakistan with components for these weapons.

The Netherlands ratified the Geneva Protocol on 31 October 1930. It also ratified the Biological Weapons Convention on 10 April 1972 and the Chemical Weapons Convention on 30 June 1995.

== United States-NATO nuclear weapons sharing ==
The Netherlands ratified the Nuclear Non-Proliferation Treaty (NPT) on 2 May 1975.

In the past (1960s till 1990s), the Netherlands took part in the deployment of NATO nuclear artillery shells for its self-propelled howitzers and missile artillery units. These 8 inch shells and warheads for Honest John, and later Lance, missiles were stored at the special ammunition stores at 't Harde and Havelterberg. These weapons are no longer operational.

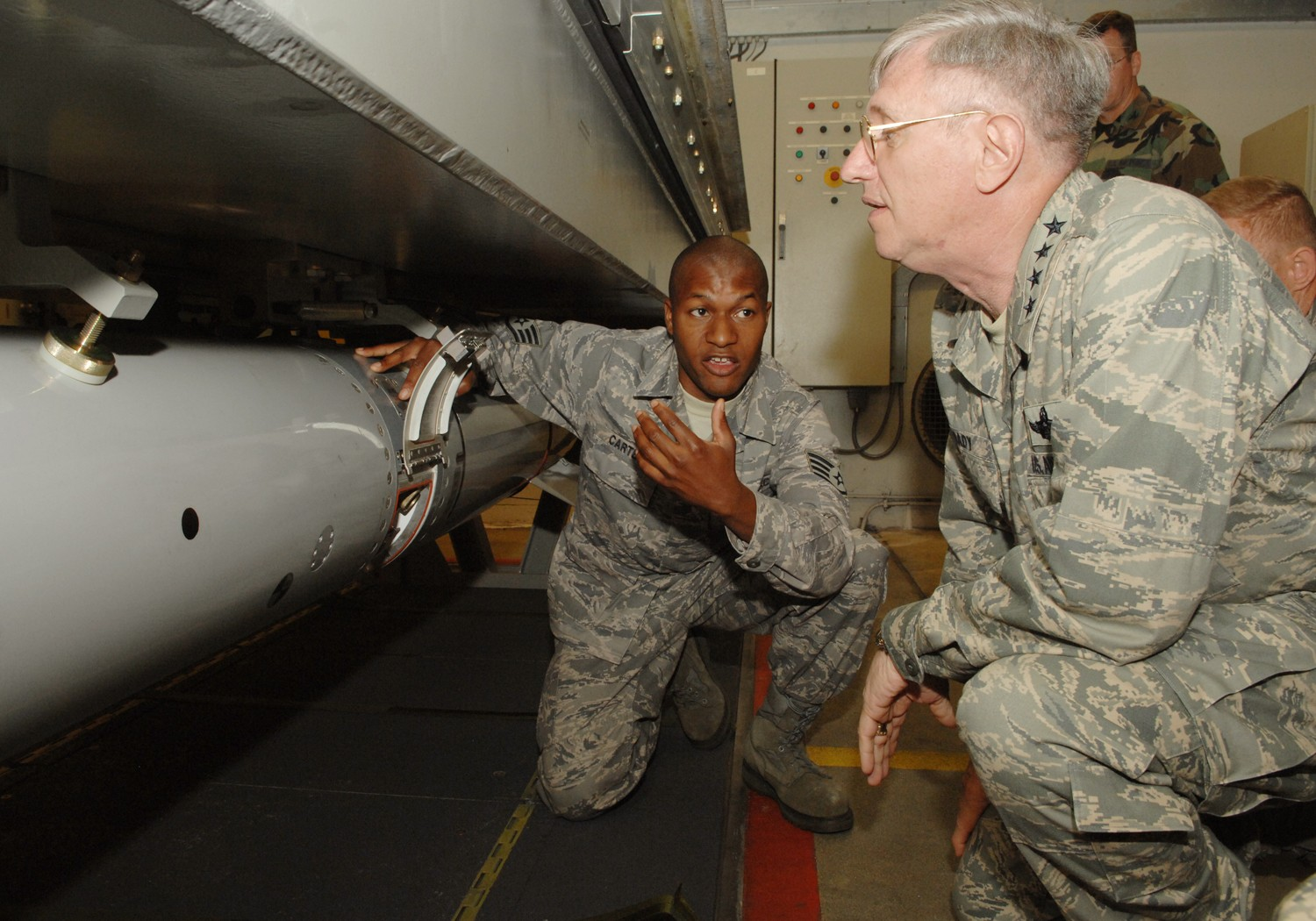
USAFE Commander General Roger Brady being shown a disarming procedure on a dummy at Volkel Air Base.

Until 2006, Royal Netherlands Navy P-3 Orion aircraft, and their predecessors the P-2 Neptunes, based at former Naval Air Station Valkenburg in Katwijk and Curaçao in the Caribbean were assigned U.S. Navy Nuclear Depth Bombs (NDB) for use in anti-submarine warfare. These weapons were originally the Mk 101 Lulu, which yielded 11 kt; later, they were replaced by the Mk-57 (also referred to as the B-57).

The NDBs were stored under U.S. Marine guard at RAF St. Mawgan, Cornwall, UK, which also held 60 similar weapons for the use of RAF Shackleton and Nimrod aircraft. The storage arrangements were agreed in 1965 between the British Prime Minister Harold Wilson and President Johnson in a secret memorandum now declassified in the UK archives.

At present (2008), the USAF still provides 22 tactical B61 nuclear bombs for use by the Netherlands under the NATO nuclear weapons sharing agreement. These weapons are stored at Volkel Air Base and, in time of war, they may be delivered by Royal Netherlands Air and Space Force F-35 warplanes. (The Dutch government has never formally admitted or denied the presence of these weapons, but former prime ministers Dries van Agt and Ruud Lubbers both acknowledged their presence in 2013.)

The U.S. insists that its forces control the weapons and that no transfer of the nuclear bombs or control over them is intended "unless and until a decision were made to go to war, at which the [NPT] treaty would no longer be controlling", so there is no breach of the NPT.

== Dutch production of precursors to chemical weapons ==
Alongside companies from the United Kingdom, France, Germany, the United States, Belgium, Spain, India, and Brazil, Dutch companies provided Iraq with the chemicals used as precursors to produce chemical weapons for use against Iran in the Iran–Iraq War.

Suffering from chemical warfare during the Iran–Iraq War (1980–1988), 2000 Iranians submitted an indictment some years ago with a Tehran court against nine companies that had provided Saddam Hussein with such chemicals, and 455 American and European companies, two thirds being German, provided aid to Iraq during its war with Iran. The United Nations published a 12,000-page report about the conflict and named the companies involved.

== Poison gas experiments ==
On 20 February 2008, it was revealed that the Netherlands had conducted chemical warfare experiments with nerve gas in the early 1950s. These experiments were conducted by the TNO organization on the request of the Defense Department. They consisted of the use of sarin, tabun, soman, and a modified French gas called Stof X (Substance X), which was more poisonous than sarin. The experiments were carried out on animals in the village of Harskamp and on the Vliehors bombing range, located on the island of Vlieland. After 1956, the only experiments were those conducted jointly with France and Belgium in the desert of Algeria, which utilized 6 kilograms of Stof X. The reason behind these experiments was the fear of an attack by the Soviet Union.

== See also ==
- Nuclear sharing

== Sources ==
- Norris, Robert S.; Andrew Burrows; Richard Fieldhouse (1994). Vol.5. British, French and Chinese Nuclear Weapons. Nuclear Weapons Databook. Oxford: Westview Press. ISBN 0-8133-1612-X.
- "UK-U.S. Memorandum of Understanding of Use of Nuclear Weapons". 1965. DEFE 24/691-E28., Contained in an exchange of letters between Prime Minister Harold Wilson and Pres Lyndon B.Johnson, declassified 2002, and now in the UK National Archives, London filed as DEFE 24/691-E28
- "To Dutch Navy weapons sharing and storage".
- "Radiator" (Document). Southern Region CND. April 1984.
