= Kleine-Brogel Air Base =

Military airfield in Belgium

Kleine Brogel Air Base
- Vliegbasis Kleine Brogel
- Near Peer, Limburg, Flemish Region in Belgium
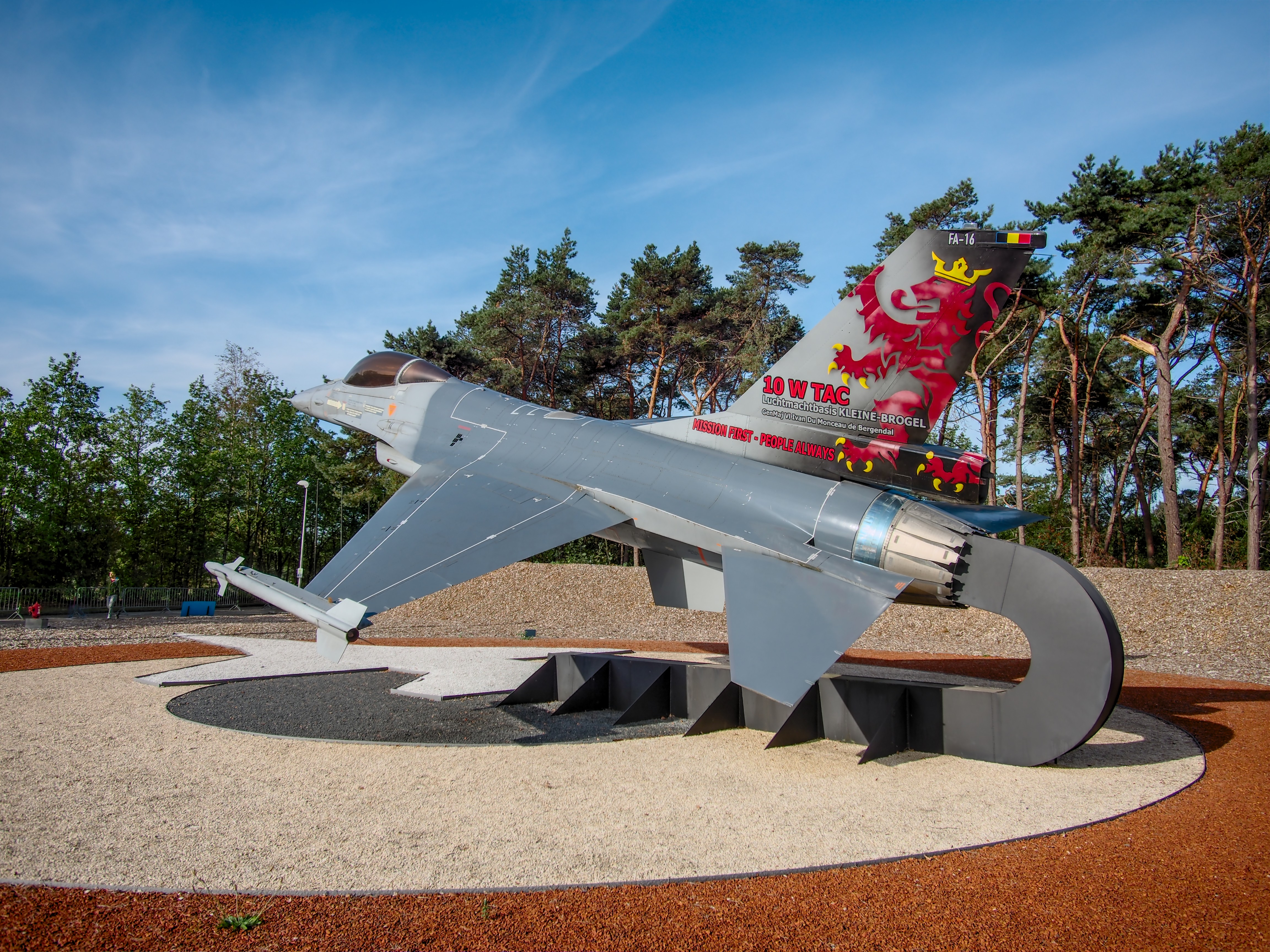
- Kleine Brogel's gate guardian, a F-16AM Fighting Falcon

- Motto Fortuna favet fortibus (Latin for 'Fortune favors the bold')

Site information
- Type: Military airfield
- Owner: Ministry of Defence
- Operator: Belgian Air Force
- Condition: Operational
- Website: kleinebrogelairbase.be

Location
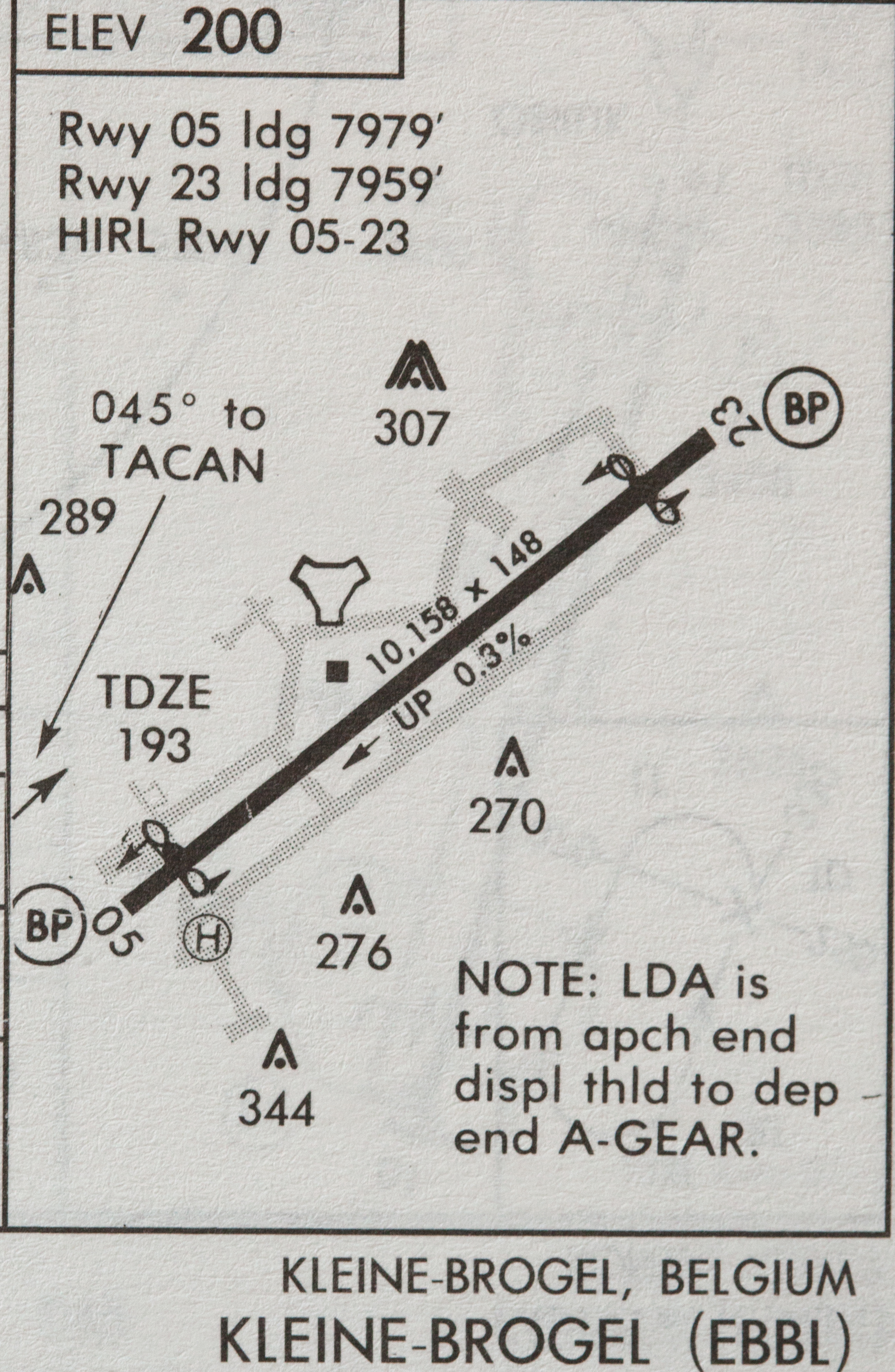
- Airport diagram
- Location in Belgium
- Coordinates: 51°10′06″N 005°28′12″E

Site history
- Built: 1944 (as tactical airfield B90)
- In use: 1944 – present

Garrison information
- Garrison: 10th Tactical Wing

Airfield information
- Identifiers: ICAO: EBBL
- Elevation: 192 feet (59 m) AMSL
Runways
Direction	Length and surface
05L/23R	3,096 m (10,157 ft) asphalt/concrete
05R/23L	2,438 m (7,999 ft) asphalt/concrete
- Source: AIP – Belgium & Luxembourg

Kleine Brogel Air Base (ICAO: EBBL) is a Belgian Air Force military airfield located 1.5 km (0.9 miles) east of Kleine-Brogel, in the municipality of Peer, Belgium. It is home to the Belgian 10th Tactical Wing, which operates F-16 Fighting Falcons. As part of nuclear sharing it is also the home of the United States Air Force's 701st Munitions Support Squadron. As of 2023, Kleine Brogel is one of six active air bases in five European countries with B61 nuclear bombs in underground WS3 Weapon Storage and Security System inside aircraft shelters.

It is also the site of a popular Belgium air show, which has been hosted periodically by the Belgian Air Force. The air show has many new and also historical aircraft on display for the public. An aviation museum for Klein Brogel with many historical items was established in 2010 in the area, featuring some of the historical aircraft that operated from the base.

== History ==
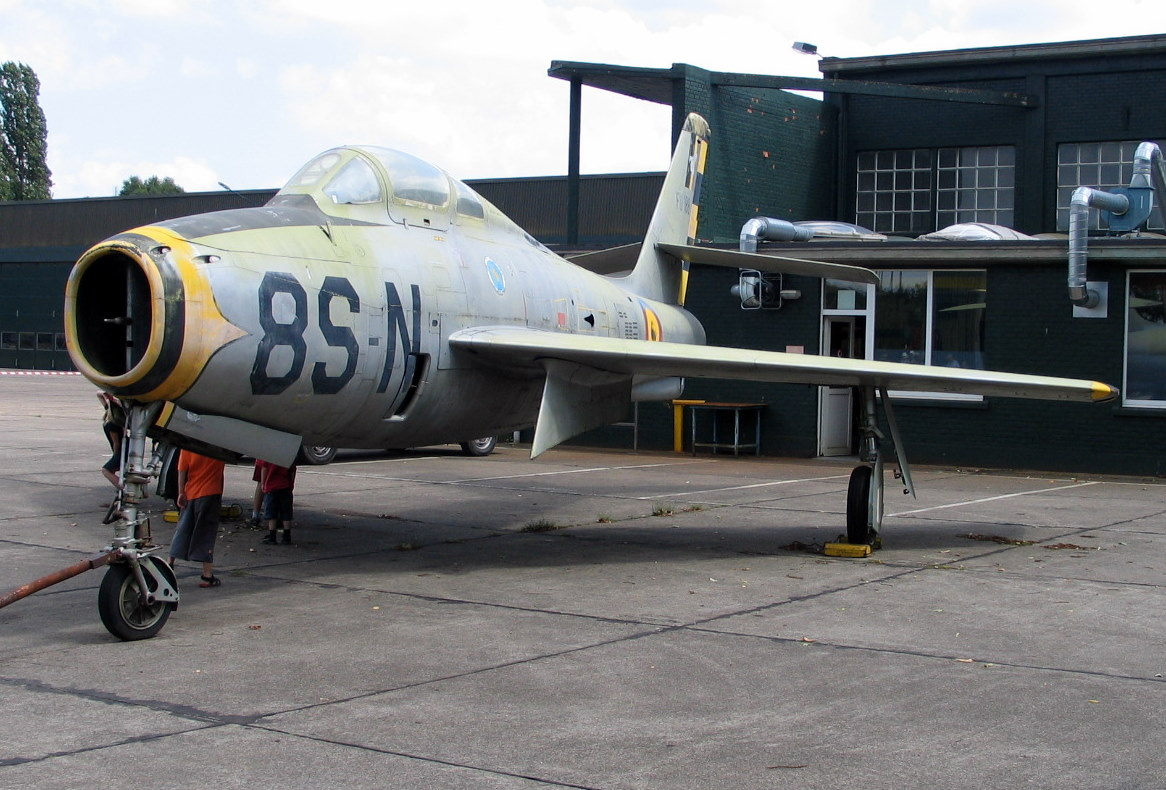
An old F-84F Thunderstreak

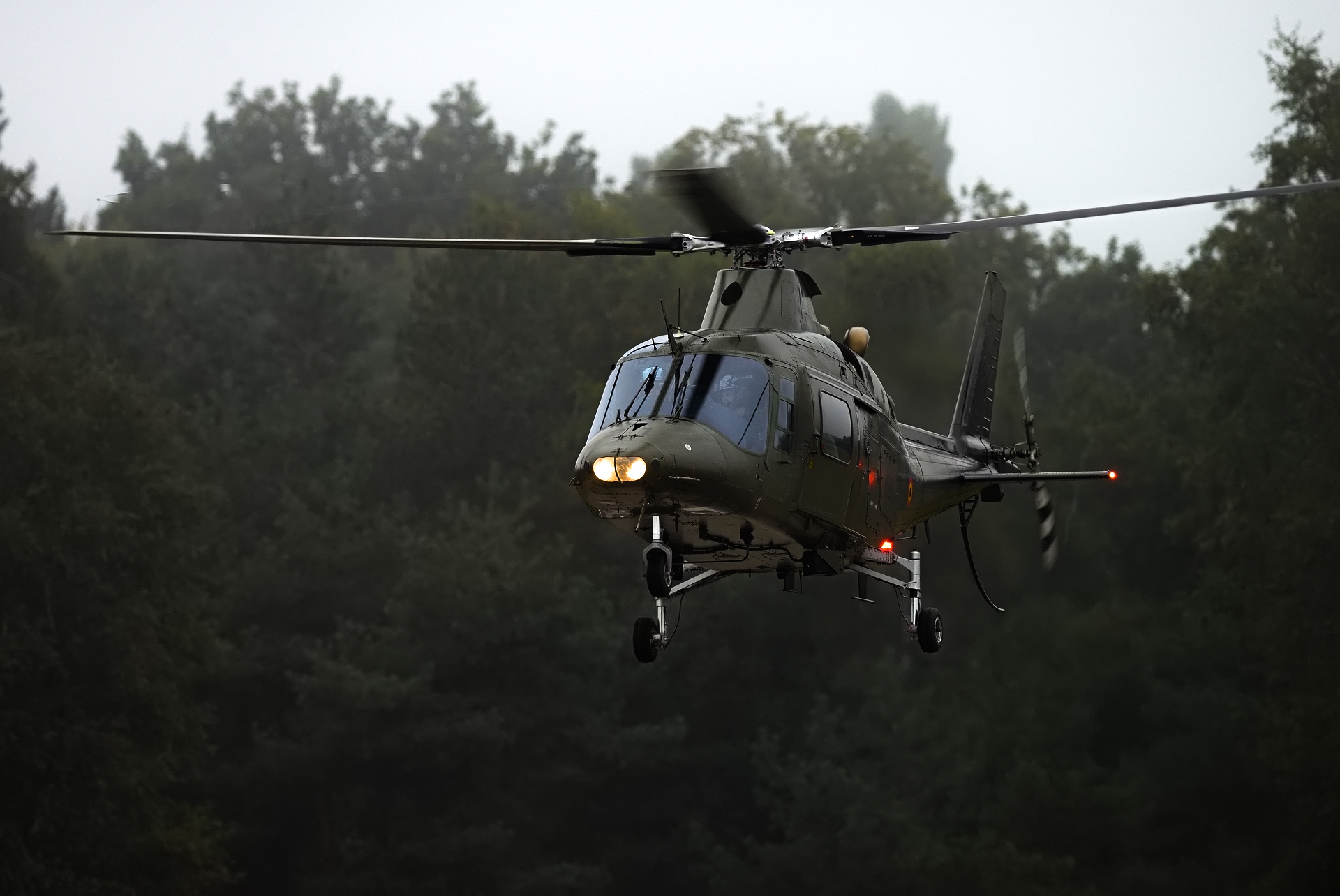
Belgian helicopter at Kleine Brogel, 2015

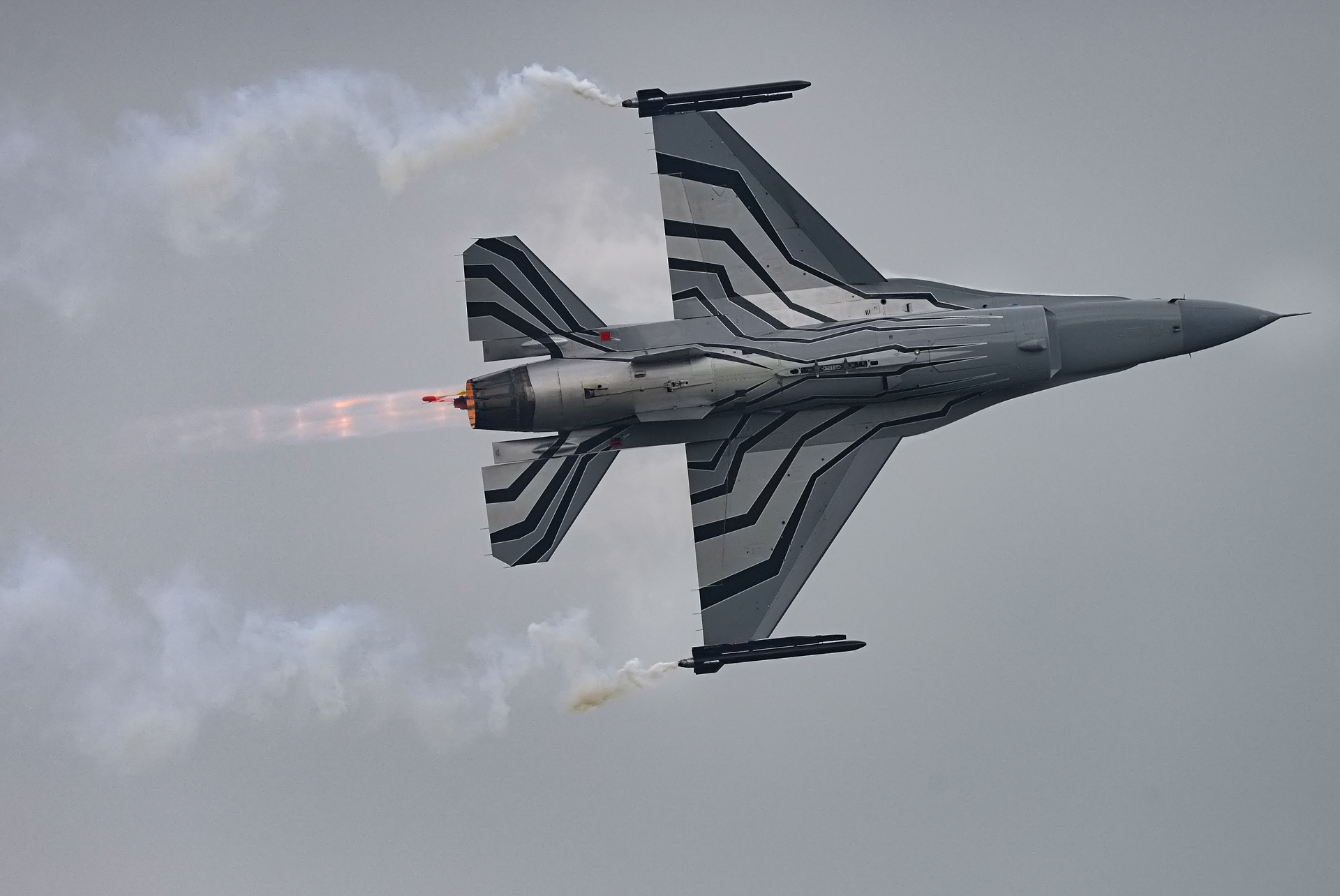
Belgian fighter jet at Kleine Brogel

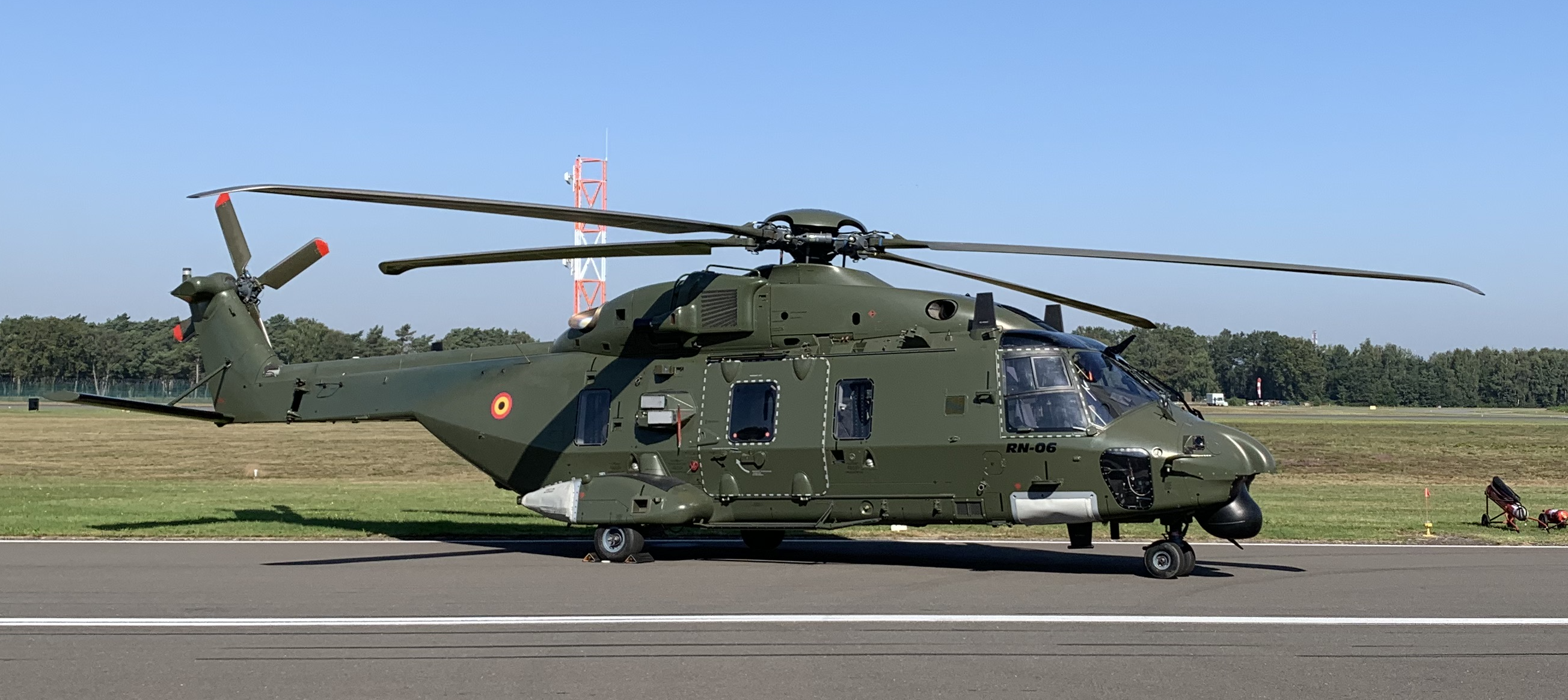
Belgian NH90 at Air Force Days 2023

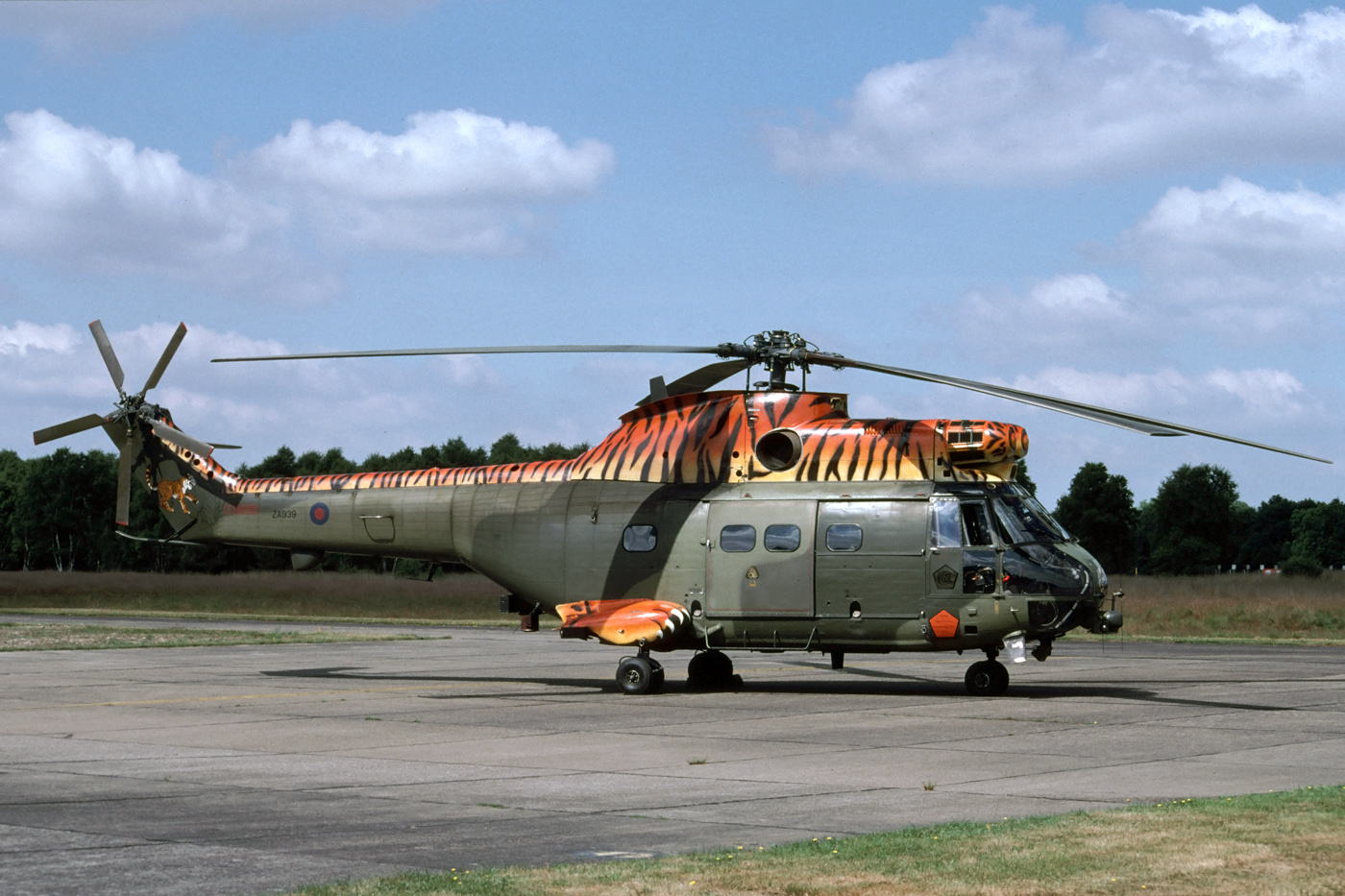
A RAF Puma HC1 at Kleine Brogel in 2001 for a Tiger Meet

In December 1944, during WW2 work began on an air field Klein Brogel by Allied forces, with work being done by the British Royal Engineers near Kleine Brogel. The base supported allied operations in region after landings in Normandy, as they headed east. By 1 March the Royal Canadian air force flying late model Spitfire fighter aircraft arrived at the base. Aircraft included versions of the Spitfire like the Spitfire FR Mk XIV, and other late model versions. There was various patrols, eventually the fighters were moved east as the war progressed. With VE Day in May 1945, wartime operations ended Allied forces left the base by September 1945.

In March 1945, Kleine Brogel airbase was established and the next months the first fighter squadrons arrived. As the decades progressed newer fighters arrived, F-104 fighters in the 1960s and F-16 fighter aircraft in the 1980s. It was one of the many important air bases in Western Europe, that helped establish air defense in Belgium. From around 1950 to 1990, the Cold War created a tense defense environment. The basic idea was each side stockpiled nuclear weapons intimidate the other side and, thus prevent a war from occurring. KB was one of the bases on Quick Reaction Alert. At some points there was some discussion about the NATO nuclear weapons at times being stored in the facility by the United States Air Force (USAF) in conjunction with military as overseen by the Belgian government. Like any possible nuclear facility the base has a high degree of attention paid to it, due to the seriousness of such devices. Under the NATO nuclear sharing arrangement, these nuclear bombs would require an actual dual key system, which would imply the simultaneous authorizations of Belgium and the United States, before any action is taken. Should that be the case, Kleine Brogel Air Base would be the only location in Belgium with nuclear weapons. According to the press, Eastern European Member States of NATO resisted the withdrawal of the "shared" nuclear bombs in Europe, fearing that it would show a weakening of the US commitment to defend the European Union against Russian aggression.

In 2010 after many years of work, the Kleine Brogel aircraft museum was established, featuring history and aviation exhibits. One aircraft there is the historical Fouga Magister jet-powered jet training aircraft.

Before June 2013, none of the five NATO member states whose air forces store nuclear bombs domestically (Belgium, Germany, Italy, the Netherlands and Turkey), have provided an official confirmation of its existence. However, former Italian President Francesco Cossiga declared that the Aeronautica Militare hosted or shared US nuclear bombs just as other NATO member states do. In an interview he talked about French weapons. On 10 June 2013, former Dutch prime minister Ruud Lubbers confirmed the existence of 22 shared nuclear bombs at Volkel Air Base.

Kleine Brogel Air Base is also the home of the United States Air Force's 701st Munitions Support Squadron which is the unit in charge of looking after the nuclear bombs. As of 2023, Kleine Brogel is one of six active air bases in five European countries with B61 nuclear bombs in underground WS3 Weapon Storage and Security System inside aircraft shelters.

AFN Benelux broadcasts from Kleine Brogel Air Base at an FM frequency of 106.2 MHz.

In September 2023, Kleine Brogel hosted its Belgian Air Force Days, with many new and historical aircraft on display. Air Forces from around Europe came and showed off many aircraft of different types. One of the highlights was the 70th anniversary show of the Patrouille de France. The previous Air Force Day show was in 2018, five years earlier.

The base has also hosted Tiger Meets, in which aircraft from all over adorned with colorful tiger themes; KB hosted for example the 45th anniversary.

In November 2025, the military base was the target of several drone reconnaissance flights who were deemed by the Belgian defense minister to be acts of espionage.

== Based units ==
Units based at Kleine Brogel.

=== Belgian Air Force ===
10th Tactical Wing

- Flying Group
  - 31st Squadron – F-16AM Falcon
  - 349th Squadron – F-16AM Falcon
  - Operational Conversion Unit – F-16BM Falcon
  - Current Operations Squadron
- Maintenance Group
- Defense and Support Group

=== United States Air Force ===
US Air Forces in Europe - Air Forces Africa (USAFE-AFAFRICA)

- Third Air Force
  - 52nd Fighter Wing
    - 52nd Munitions Maintenance Group
      - 701st Munition Support Squadron

== See also ==
Other air bases with US nuclear weapon vaults in Europe:

- Aviano Air Base, Italy
- Ghedi Air Base, Italy
- Büchel Air Base, Germany
- Volkel Air Base, NL
- Ramstein Air Base, Germany
- RAF Lakenheath, England
- Araxos Air Base, Greece
- Balikesir Air Base, Turkey
- Incirlik Air Base, Turkey
- Akıncı Air Base, Turkey
