= List of United States Air Force munitions squadrons =

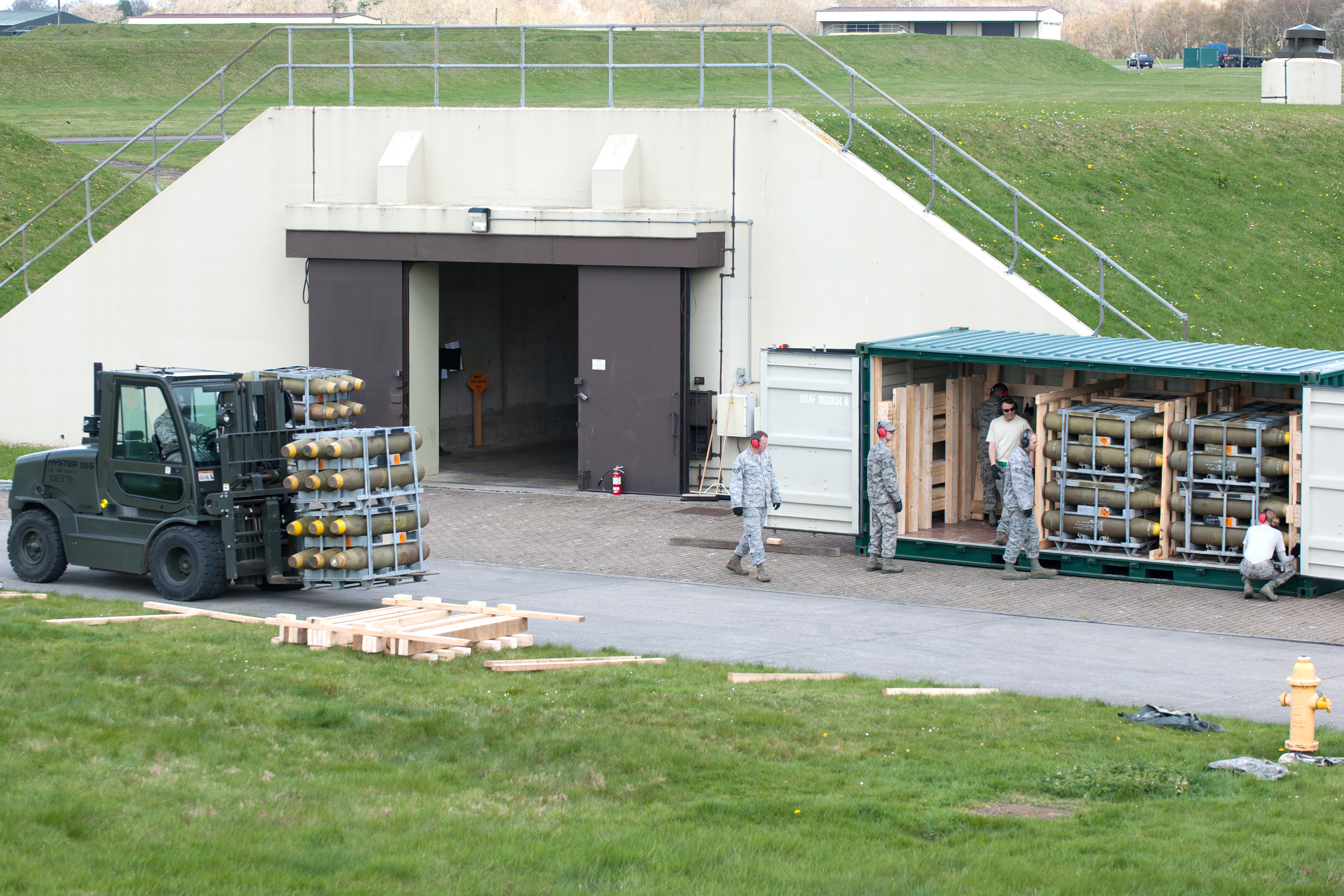
A crew from the 420th Munitions Squadron at RAF Welford in 2012

Munition Support Squadrons (MUNS) are NATO units that receive, store, maintain and keep custody and control of nuclear weapons in Europe. Usually consisting of 125 to 150 troops, each MUNS is located on a NATO base that also hosts a NATO strike wing. When directed, a MUNS releases nuclear weapons to the strike wing commander.

Most details about NATO's nuclear deployments are secret. The only officially acknowledged information is that the standoff (air-dropped) weapons are currently B61 types managed through the Weapons Storage and Security System (WS3). Built in the 1980s, WS3 are vaults that con house four weapons in the floors of the aircraft shelters, making them less vulnerable to attack and more convenient for the strike commander. In 1986, the Pentagon released a list of airbases in Europe and in the Far East that have WS3s.

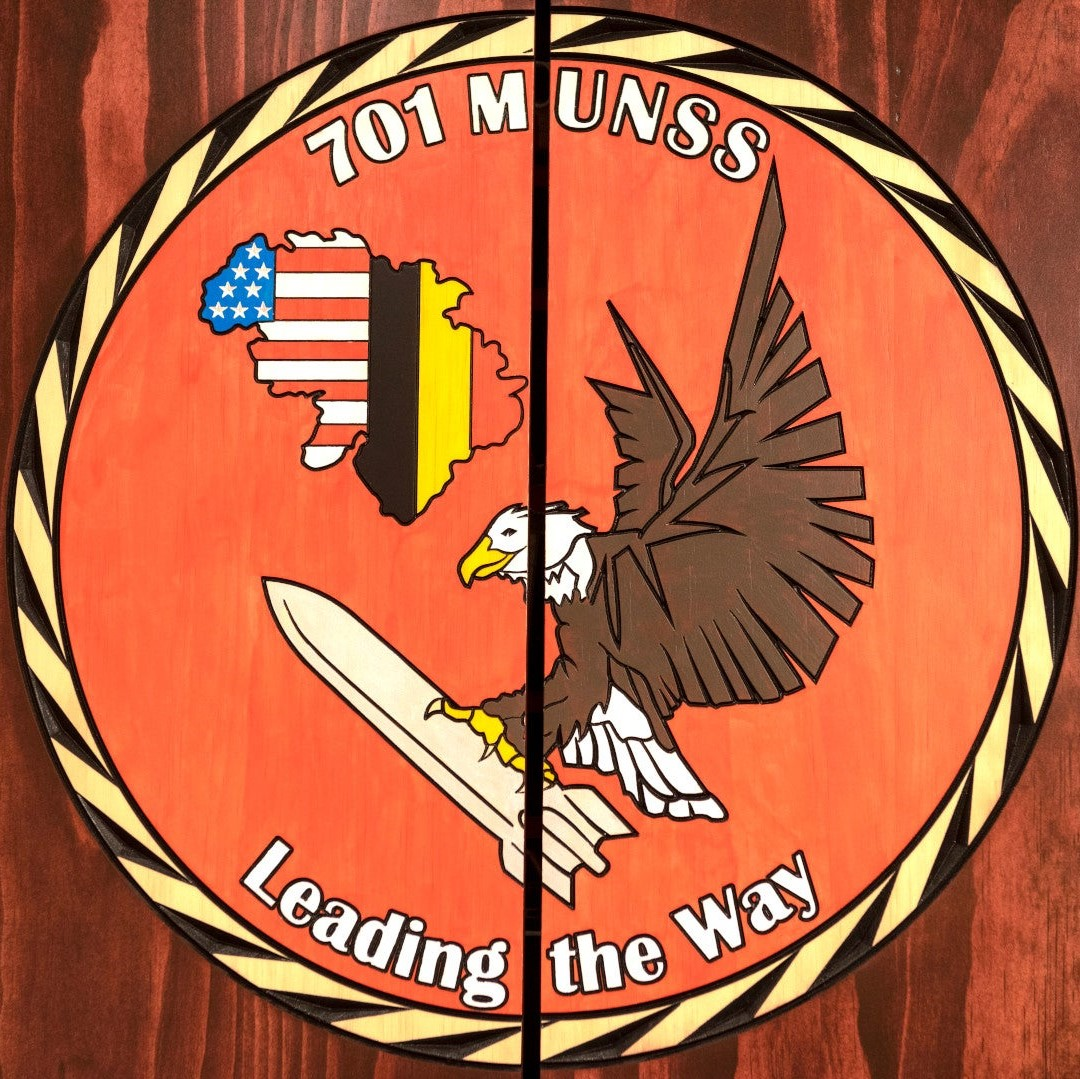
Unit insignia of the 701st MUNSS

Since the collapse of the Soviet Union and the Warsaw Pact, the number of NATO airbases and the number of operational WS3 has been reduced. In 2017, Hans M. Kristensen, the director of the Nuclear Information Project with the Federation of American Scientists (FAS) in Washington declared that the numbers of NATO-assigned US nuclear weapons in Europe have not been changed since 2009 so it is supposed that they are currently still operational in Turkey, Italy, Germany, Belgium and in the Netherlands.

In March 2021, the Pentagon briefly posted a picture of the unit insignia of the 701st Munitions Support Squadron at Kleine Brogel Air Base, Belgium which depicted US and Belgian flags above an eagle clutching a B-61 weapon. The photo was removed after it drew media attention.

== Munitions Squadrons (MUNS) ==
- 31st Munitions Squadron: Aviano Air Base, Italy, under USAF 31st Fighter Wing (F-16)
- 39th Weapons System Security Group: Incirlik Air Base, Turkey, under USAF 39th Air Base Wing
- 48th Munitions Squadron: RAF Lakenheath, United Kingdom, under USAF 48th Fighter Wing (F-15)
- 52nd Munitions Maintenance Group: Spangdahlem Air Base, Germany, commanding 4 dislocated squadrons (MUNSS)
  - 701st Munitions Support Squadron: Kleine Brogel Air Base, Belgium, supporting Belgian 10 Tactische Wing (F-16)
  - 702nd Munitions Support Squadron: Büchel Air Base, Germany, supporting German Taktisches Luftwaffengeschwader 33 (Tornado IDS)
  - 703rd Munitions Support Squadron: Volkel Air Base, Netherlands, supporting Netherlands Air Combat Command (F-35)
  - 704th Munitions Support Squadron: Ghedi Air Base, Italy, supporting Italian 6º Stormo (Tornado IDS)
  - Operating Location Ramstein: Ramstein Air Base, Germany, for maintenance on weapons storage and security systems within the EUCOM AOR, scheduled maintenance at European inactive sites, WS3 unscheduled and STMS periodic maintenance at USAFE active sites.
- 86th Munitions squadron: Ramstein Air Base, Germany, under 86th Airlift Wing
- 18th Munitions Squadron: Kadena Air Base, Japan, under USAF 18th Fighter Wing (F-15)

=== Former Squadrons ===
- 605th Munitions Support Squadron: Memmingen Air Base, Germany (1993-1996)
- 7261st Munitions Support Squadron: Memmingen Air Base, Germany (1963-1993)
- 7391st Munitions Support Squadron: Balıkesir Air Base, Turkey (1966-1993)
- 7392nd Munitions Support Squadron: Eskişehir Air Base, Turkey (1962-1990)
- 7393rd Munitions Support Squadron: Mürted Air Base, Turkey (1965-1994)
- 7394th Munitions Support Squadron: Malatya Erhaç Air Base, Turkey (1963-1990)
- 7401st Munitions Support Squadron: Rimini Air Base, Italy (1961-1993)
- 7502nd Munitions Support Squadron: Nörvenich Air Base, Germany (1962-1993)

== See also ==
- List of United States Air Force squadrons
