= Ghedi Air Base =

"Luigi Olivari" Ghedi Air Base
- IATA: none; ICAO: LIPL

Summary
- Airport type: Military
- Owner: Italy
- Operator: Aeronautica Militare Italiana
- Location: Ghedi, Brescia, Italy
- Built: 1909
- Elevation AMSL: 333 ft / 101 m
- Coordinates: 45°25′56″N 010°16′04″E

Map
- Location of Ghedi Air Base

Runways
Direction	Length		Surface
Direction	ft	m	Surface
13/31	9,813	2,991	Asphalt
- Sources:DAFIF

Ghedi Air Base (Italian: Base aerea di Ghedi, ICAO: LIPL) is a base of the Italian Air Force in Ghedi, about 15 kilometres from Brescia, northern Italy.

It is home to the 6º Stormo of the Italian Air Force with the 102º Gruppo (Paperi) with F-35A Lightning II, the 154º Gruppo (Diavoli Rossi) with F-35A Lightning II and the 155º Gruppo (Pantere Nere) with Tornado ECR.

It is one of six active air bases in five European countries with B61 nuclear bombs in underground WS3 Weapon Storage and Security System inside aircraft shelters. and as of 2019 housed more than 40 nuclear weapons.

The commander since 2017 is the Italian Air Force Colonel Luca Maineri.

== See also ==
Air bases with US nuclear weapon vaults in Europe per nuclear sharing:

- Aviano Air Base, Italy
- Büchel Air Base, Germany
- Kleine Brogel Air Base, Belgium
- Volkel Air Base, NL
- Ramstein Air Base, Germany
- RAF Lakenheath, England
- Araxos Air Base, Greece
- Balikesir Air Base, Turkey
- Incirlik Air Base, Turkey
- Akıncı Air Base, Turkey
