= 10th Tactical Wing =

- Active: December 1951–present
- Country: Belgium
- Branch: Belgian Air Force
- Garrison/HQ: Kleine Brogel
- Motto: Fortuna favet fortibus

Commanders
- Current commander: Colonel Jeroen Poesen
- Notable commanders: Major General Count Ivan Du Monceau de Bergendal

Aircraft flown
- Fighter: F-16 Fighting Falcon

The 10th Tactical Wing (Dutch: 10 Tactische Wing) is a wing in the Belgian Air Force of the Belgian Armed Forces. It is based at the Kleine Brogel Air Base, in the municipality of Peer. It employs approximately 38 F-16 Fighting Falcons and 1700 staff.

It is organised into three groups, the Flying Group, the Maintenance Group and the Defence and Support Group, and is supported by a medical detachment, a territorial maintenance team and the 701st Munitions Support Squadron, 52d Fighter Wing, United States Air Force. The 701st Munitions Support Squadron maintains U.S. tactical nuclear weapons for use by Belgian aircraft in wartime under the NATO Nuclear sharing policy. The Flying Group comprises the 31st Squadron, the 349th Squadron and an Operational Conversion Unit.
