= Roger A. Brady =

United States Air Force general

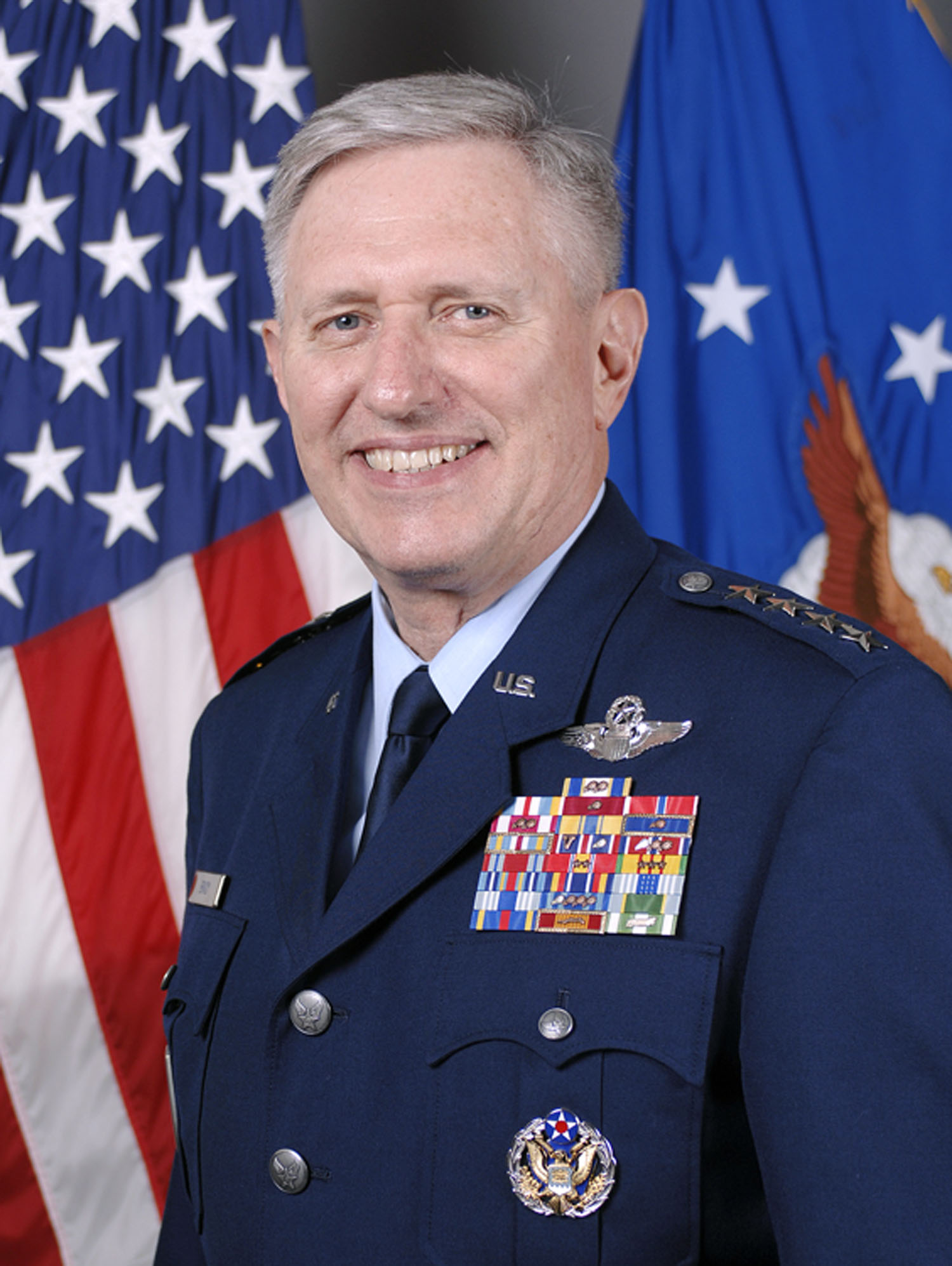
- General Roger A. Brady; Commander, U.S. Air Forces in Europe
- Born: September 11, 1946 (age 80); Okmulgee, Oklahoma, U.S.
- Military career
- Allegiance: United States of America
- Branch: United States Air Force
- Service years: 1968–2011
- Rank: General
- Commands: U.S. Air Forces in Europe
- Awards: Defense Distinguished Service Medal; Air Force Distinguished Service Medal (3); Defense Superior Service Medal; Legion of Merit (2); Bronze Star; Meritorious Service Medal (3); Air Force Commendation Medal

Roger Alan Brady (born November 11, 1946) is a former United States Air Force (USAF) four-star general who last served as the 33rd Commander, U.S. Air Forces in Europe (USAFE) which he also concurrently served as commander of NATO Allied Air Command, Ramstein Air Base, Germany and director of Joint Air Power Competence Center, Kalkar, Germany from January 9, 2008, to December 13, 2010. Prior to that he served as deputy chief of staff for manpower and personnel from June 2004 to January 2008. As commander of USAFE, he has responsibility for USAF activities in the U.S. Africa Command theater.

He has commanded a support group and flying training wing, and he was vice commander of an air logistics center. The general has served as a director of personnel, logistics, plans and programs, and operations at three major commands. His involvement in deployed operations includes service in the Vietnam War, deployment of NATO forces in support of Operation Desert Storm, securing coalition support for the stand-up of expeditionary wings during Operation Allied Force, and providing Total Force and Civil Reserve Air Fleet air mobility support to operations Noble Eagle, Enduring Freedom and Iraqi Freedom.

General Brady is a command pilot with more than 3,900 hours in T-37, T-38, T-1, KC-135, C-21, and C-5.

General Brady's retirement ceremony was held December 13, 2010 at Ramstein AB and he ended active duty as of February 1, 2011. Since retirement, he has served on the board of trustees for Mid-Atlantic Christian University.

== Education ==
General Brady entered the USAF in 1969 through the University of Oklahoma (OU) Air Force ROTC program. While at OU, he earned a Bachelor of Arts degree in foreign services in 1968, followed by a Master of Arts degree in political science from Colorado State University in 1969. Brady received additional professional military education at the Air Command and Staff College at Maxwell Air Force Base, and the National War College at Fort McNair, in addition to administrative and national security programs at Columbia University and Harvard University.

== Assignments ==
- November 1969 – July 1970, student, Armed Forces Air Intelligence Training Center, Lowry Air Force Base, Colorado
- July 1970 – July 1971, air intelligence officer, 20th Tactical Air Support Squadron, Da Nang Air Base, South Vietnam
- July 1971 – June 1972, Chief, Target Processing Branch, 320th Bomb Wing, Mather AFB, California
- July 1972 – October 1973, student, undergraduate pilot training, 71st Flying Training Wing, Vance AFB, Oklahoma
- November 1973 – March 1974, student, KC-135 Aircrew Training, Castle AFB, California
- April 1974 – April 1977, co-pilot, aircraft and flight commander of 301st Air Refueling Wing, Rickenbacker AFB, Ohio
- May 1977 – August 1977, student, pilot instructor training, 12th Flying Training Wing, Randolph AFB, Texas
- September 1977 – August 1981, instructor pilot, flight commander and Chief, Standardization and Evaluation Division, 64th Flying Training Wing, Reese AFB, Texas
- August 1981 – June 1982, student, Air Command and Staff College, Maxwell AFB, Alabama
- July 1982 – June 1984, Chief, T-38 Standardization and Evaluation, Directorate of Operations, Headquarters Air Training Command, Randolph AFB, Texas
- July 1984 – July 1987, staff officer, Airlift Special Operations and Training Division, later, special assistant and executive officer to the deputy chief of staff for research, development and acquisition, Headquarters U.S. Air Force, Washington, D.C.
- August 1987 – June 1988, student, National War College, Fort Lesley J. McNair, Washington, D.C.
- July 1988 – June 1991, staff officer, Policies and Studies Branch, later, Chief, Long-Range Plans Branch, AIRSOUTH Arms Control Team, and later, Chief, Programs and Requirements Branch, Allied Air Forces Southern Europe, Naples, Italy
- July 1991 – May 1992, commander of 3415th Support Group, Lowry AFB, Colorado
- June 1992 – June 1993, director of personnel, Headquarters Air Training Command, Randolph AFB, Texas
- July 1993 – July 1995, commander of 64th Flying Training Wing, Reese AFB, Texas
- August 1995 – June 1997, vice commander of Ogden Air Logistics Center, Hill AFB, Utah
- July 1997 – June 1998, director of logistics, Headquarters U.S. Air Forces in Europe, Ramstein AB, Germany
- July 1998 – July 1999, director of plans and programs, Headquarters USAFE, Ramstein AB, Germany
- July 1999 – October 2000, director of logistics, Headquarters Air Mobility Command, Scott AFB, Illinois
- October 2000 – November 2003, director of operations, Headquarters AMC, Scott AFB, Illinois
- November 2003 – June 2004, special assistant to the chief of staff for force development, Headquarters U.S. Air Force, Washington, D.C.
- June 2004 – January 2008, deputy chief of staff, personnel, Headquarters U.S. Air Force, Washington, D.C.
- January 2008 – December 2010, commander of U.S. Air Forces in Europe; commander of NATO Allied Air Component Command, Ramstein; and director of Joint Air Power Competence Center, Kalkar, Germany

== Flight information ==
- Rating: Command pilot
- Flight hours: 3,900
- Aircraft flown: T-37, T-38, T-1, KC-135, C-21 and C-5

== Awards and decorations ==
Air Force Command Pilot Badge
Headquarters Air Force Badge
Allied Air Command Badge

Defense Distinguished Service Medal
Air Force Distinguished Service Medal with two bronze oak leaf clusters
Defense Superior Service Medal
Legion of Merit with bronze oak leaf cluster
Bronze Star Medal
Meritorious Service Medal with two bronze oak leaf clusters
Air Force Commendation Medal
Presidential Unit Citation with bronze oak leaf cluster
Joint Meritorious Unit Award
Air Force Outstanding Unit Award with Valor device and silver oak leaf cluster
Air Force Organizational Excellence Award with silver and two bronze oak leaf clusters
Combat Readiness Medal
National Defense Service Medal with two bronze service stars
Vietnam Service Medal with three service stars
Global War on Terrorism Expeditionary Medal
Global War on Terrorism Service Medal
Air Force Overseas Short Tour Service Ribbon
Air Force Overseas Long Tour Service Ribbon
Air Force Longevity Service Award with silver and three bronze oak leaf clusters
Air Force Longevity Service Award (second ribbon to denote 10th award)
Small Arms Expert Marksmanship Ribbon
Air Force Training Ribbon
Vietnam Gallantry Cross Unit Award
Vietnam Campaign Medal

Other awards

- September 7, 2010: Order of the Sword, USAFE.

== Effective dates of promotion ==
Promotions
Insignia	Rank	Date
	General	January 9, 2008
	Lieutenant General	June 3, 2004
	Major general	March 4, 1999
	Brigadier general	October 1, 1995
	Colonel	January 1, 1991
	Lieutenant colonel	March 1, 1985
	Major	April 22, 1980
	Captain	May 13, 1972
	First lieutenant	November 13, 1970
	Second lieutenant	June 2, 1968

== See also ==
- List of commanders of USAFE
