= Weapons Storage and Security System =

System used on NATO military airfields

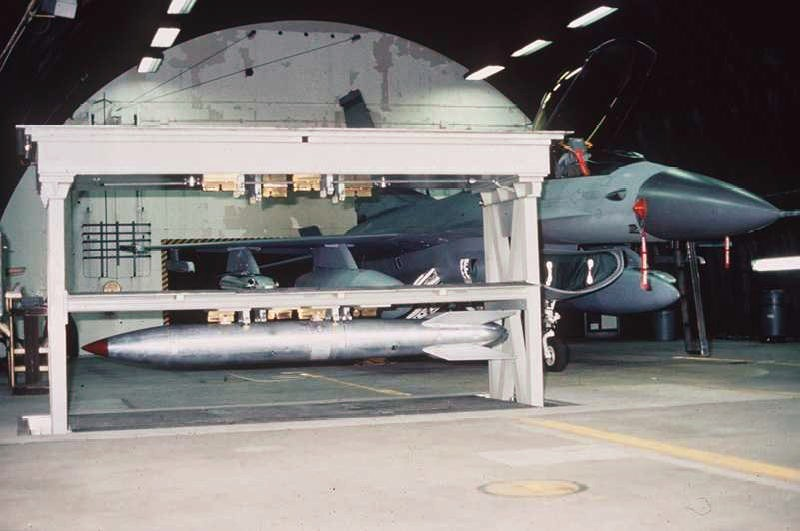
Weapons Storage and Security System vault in raised position holding a B61 nuclear bomb. The vault is within a Protective Aircraft Shelter

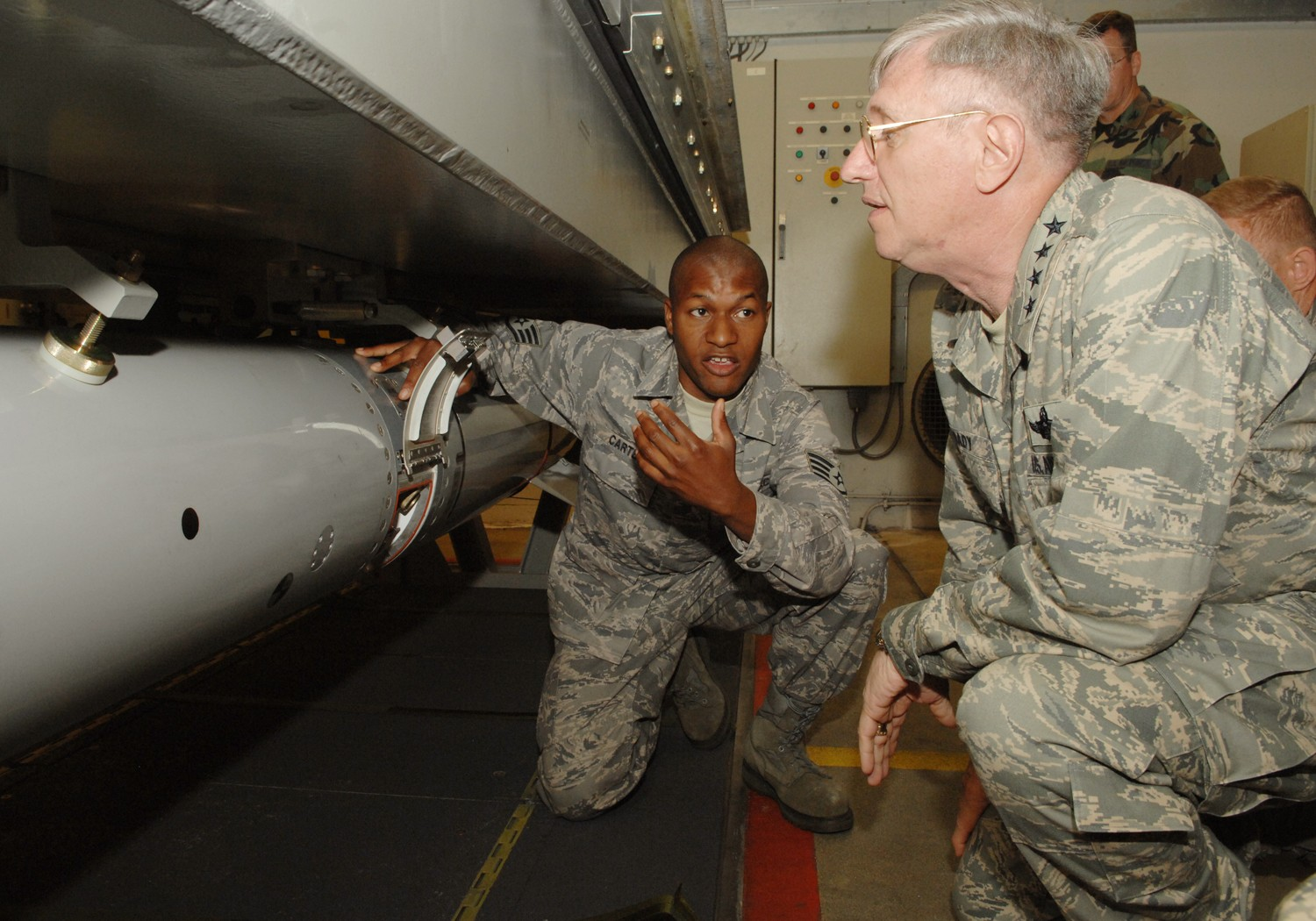
General Roger Brady being shown a dummy nuclear weapon in a Weapons Storage and Security System at Volkel Air Base

Weapons Storage and Security System (WS3) is a system including electronic controls and vaults built into the floors of Protective Aircraft Shelters (PAS) on several NATO military airfields all over the world. These vaults are used for safe special weapons storage, typically of tactical B61 nuclear bombs. Historically the system was also called within NATO the Weapon Security and Survivability System (WS3) or Weapons Survivability and Security System.

== History ==
WS3 system logo

During the Cold War in Europe, US and NATO bases used by the Quick Reaction Alert readiness forces stored their nuclear bombs in heavily secured weapon storage areas located on or in the vicinity of the base. The process of transferring and mounting the weapons to the aircraft took several hours and required a large coordinated team of security, transportation and engineer personnel; when the alert or exercise was called off, it took an equal amount of time and trouble to return the weapons to the bunkers.

The standard system had functioned since the late 1940s, but was unsatisfactory for overseas duty in multiple regards: primarily, it required the weapons be kept mounted on the body of the alert aircraft to ensure they could take off quickly enough when called (despite aircraft not being designed to safely or securely store nuclear weapons). Secondarily, it also posed an OPSEC risk, as any large amount of activity around the weapons bunkers during a time of crisis would be quickly spotted by the Soviets and interpreted as a prelude to nuclear attack. Lastly, there was a serious risk that wartime damage to airbases from a first strike using nuclear airburst or persistent chemical weapons attack would deny access to the bunkers for many weeks without actually destroying them, thus creating a much-feared "soft kill" scenario in which most of NATO's theater-based nuclear assets could be rapidly neutralized by a much smaller number of Soviet "soft" area denial strikes. In a projected multi-day war, this was feared to be a decisive handicap.

Deployment of the WS3 system was authorized in 1988, and they were in widespread use by 1995.

== Specifications ==
The WS3 system consists of a Weapons Storage Vault (WSV) and electronic monitoring and control systems built into the concrete floor of a specially-secured Hardened Aircraft Shelter. One vault can hold up to four nuclear weapons and in the lowered position provides ballistic protection through its hardened lid and reinforced sidewalls. The WS3 system allows storage directly underneath the aircraft intended to carry the bombs, eliminating the need to both store the weapons on the aircraft or to wait for them to be transferred from external bunkers. Very few personnel are needed to operate the unit, and the loading process can be completed in minutes with just a few armorers and no vehicles needed.

The electronic systems include various classified sensors, along with electronic data-transmission and security equipment such as video, motion detectors, closed circuit TV and thermal imaging devices, thus making the WS3 shelters more secure against sabotage and infiltration compared to existing igloo-style bunkers.

== Deployment ==
215 WS3 vaults were built for the United States Air Forces in Europe at 13 sites in seven countries. Additionally 34 WS3 vaults were built for the Royal Air Force to store the WE.177 nuclear bomb; 10 at RAF Brüggen in Germany and 24 at RAF Marham in Britain.

== Sources ==
- Bechtel National Inc. (USA), Main contractor for the construction program
- Mannesmann Anlagenbau, Düsseldorf, Germany subcontractor mechanical system parts.

== See also ==
- List of established military terms
- War reserve stock
- Supply depot
