= Charles F. Wald =

United States Air Force general

General Charles F. Wald
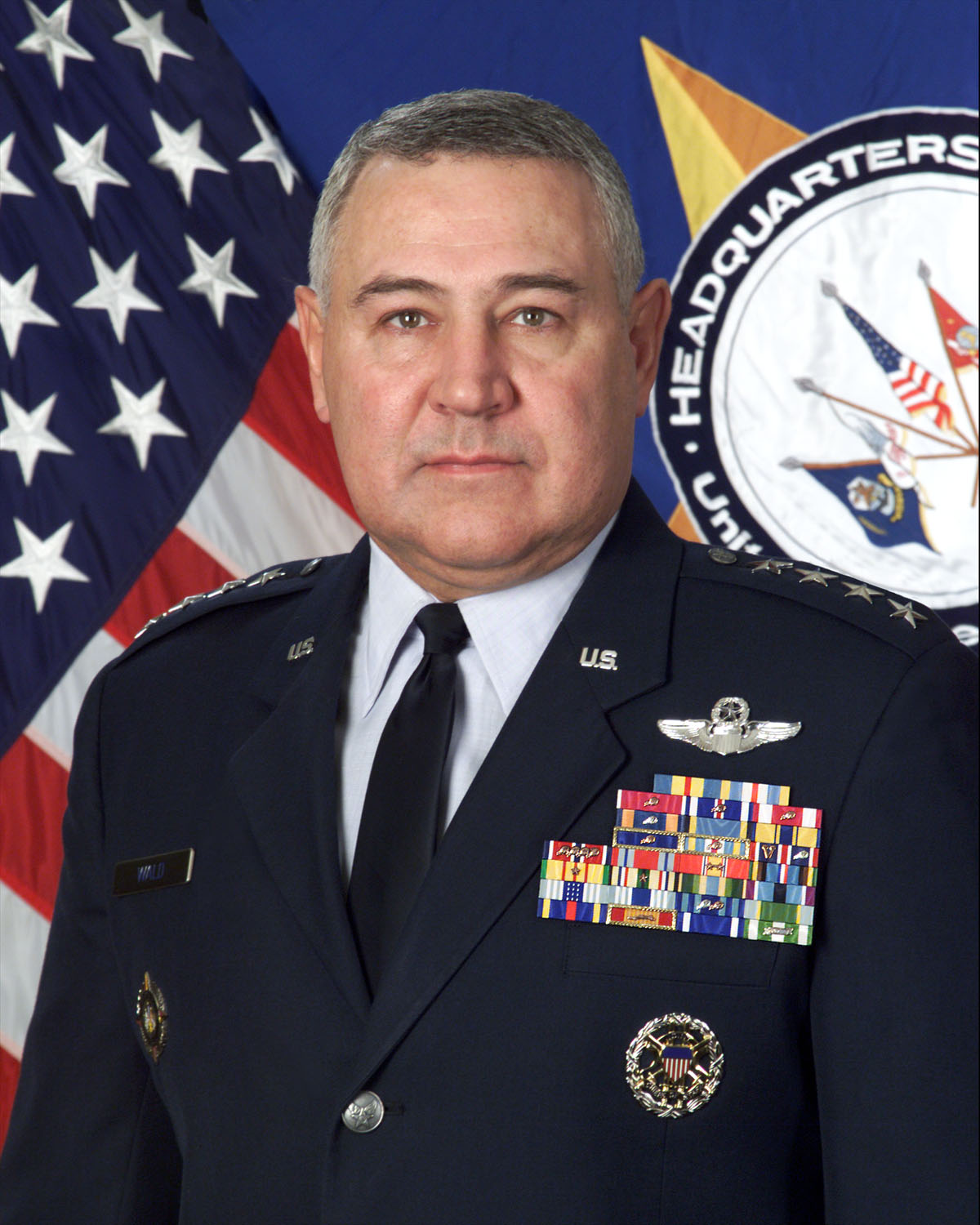
- Born: 8 July 1948 (age 78); North Dakota, U.S.
- Military career
- Allegiance: United States
- Branch: United States Air Force
- Service years: 1971 - 2006 (35 years)
- Rank: General
- Nickname: Chuck
- Commands: 9th Air Force; 31st Fighter Wing
- Conflicts: Vietnam War
- Awards: See below

Charles F. Wald (/wɔːld/; born 8 July 1948) is a retired United States Air Force general and former Deputy Commander of United States European Command. He retired on 1 July 2006, and was succeeded by General William E. Ward.

== Military career ==
Wald earned his commission through the Air Force ROTC program in 1971. He has combat time as an O-2A forward air controller in Vietnam and as an F-16 pilot flying over Bosnia. The general has served as a T-37 instructor pilot and F-15 flight commander. Other duties include Chief of the U.S. Air Force Combat Terrorism Center, support group commander, operations group commander, and special assistant to the Chief of Staff for National Defense Review. He was also the Director of Strategic Planning and Policy at Headquarters U.S. Air Force, and served on the Joint Staff as the Vice Director for Strategic Plans and Policy.

Wald commanded the 31st Fighter Wing at Aviano Air Base, Italy, where on 30 August 1995, he led one of the wing's initial strike packages against the ammunition depot at Pale, Bosnia-Herzegovina, in one of the first NATO combat operations. He also commanded the 9th Air Force and U.S. Central Command Air Forces, Shaw Air Force Base, South Carolina, where he led the development of the Afghanistan air campaign for Operation Enduring Freedom, including the idea of embedding tactical air control parties in ground special operations forces. Prior to assuming his current position, he was Deputy Chief of Staff for Air and Space Operations at the Pentagon.

Wald, director and senior advisor to the Aerospace & Defense Industry for Deloitte LLP, is responsible for providing senior leadership in strategy and relationships with defense contractors and Department of Defense (DOD) program executives. He is a subject matter specialist in weapons procurement and deployment, counter terrorism, national, energy and international security policy. Prior to joining Deloitte, General Wald was the Vice President, International Programs for L-3 Communications Corporation, based in Washington D.C.

Wald has argued that there is a military option for a strike against Iran.

Wald serves as a co-leader of the National Security Project (NSP) at the Bipartisan Policy Center.

== Personal ==
In the 2024 United States presidential election, Wald endorsed Kamala Harris.

== Football career ==
While attending North Dakota State University, Wald was a president of the Alpha Tau Omega fraternity and a starting wide receiver in the North Dakota State Bison football team. He was selected in the 14th round of the 1970 NFL draft by the Atlanta Falcons.

== Education ==
- High School Diploma, Bishop Ryan High School, Minot, North Dakota
- 1971 Bachelor of Arts degree in pre-law, North Dakota State University
- 1975 Squadron Officer School, Maxwell AFB, Alabama
- 1982 Air Command and Staff College, Maxwell AFB, Alabama
- 1982 Master of Political Science degree in international relations, Troy State University
- 1990 National War College, Fort Lesley J. McNair, Washington, D.C.
- 1993 Program for Senior Officials in National Security, Harvard University, Cambridge, Massachusetts

== Assignments ==
1. February 1971 - January 1972, student, undergraduate pilot training, Williams AFB, Arizona
2. May 1972 - February 1973, forward air controller, Da Nang AB, South Vietnam
3. May 1973 - May 1976, instructor pilot and wing flight examiner, Air Training Command, Craig AFB, Alabama
4. December 1976 - August 1978, project officer, Operational Systems Engineering Branch, Norton AFB, California
5. August 1978 - August 1981, F-15A aircraft commander, instructor pilot and flight commander, 22nd Tactical Fighter Squadron, Bitburg AB, West Germany
6. August 1981 - September 1982, student, Air Command and Staff College, Maxwell AFB, Alabama
7. September 1982 - August 1985, flight commander, assistant operations and operations officer, 71st Tactical Fighter Squadron, Langley AFB, Virginia
8. August 1985 - August 1989, Chief, Strategic North Atlantic Treaty Organization Branch; later, Chief, Strategic and Middle East-Africa Branch; later, Chief, U.S. Air Force Combat Terrorism Center; later, assistant executive officer to the Air Force Chief of Staff, Washington, D.C.
9. August 1989 - July 1990, student, National War College, Fort Lesley J. McNair, Washington, D.C.
10. July 1990 - March 1993, Deputy Commander for Operations, 86th Tactical Fighter Wing; later, Commander, 86th Support Group; later, Commander, 86th Operations Group, Ramstein AB, Germany
11. March 1993 - September 1993, executive officer to Deputy Chief of Staff of Operations, Boerfink AB, Germany
12. September 1993 - May 1995, executive officer to Director of Operations and U.S. Senior National Representative, Headquarters Allied Air Forces Central Europe, Ramstein AB, Germany
13. May 1995 - July 1997, Commander, 31st Fighter Wing, Aviano AB, Italy
14. July 1997 - January 1998, special assistant to the Chief of Staff for National Defense Review, Headquarters U.S. Air Force, Washington, D.C.
15. January 1998 - October 1998, Director of Strategic Planning and Policy, Deputy Chief of Staff for Plans and Programs, Headquarters U.S. Air Force, Washington, D.C.
16. October 1998 - January 2000, Vice Director for Strategic Plans and Policy, the Joint Staff, Washington, D.C.
17. January 2000 - November 2001, Commander, 9th Air Force and U.S. Central Command Air Forces, Shaw AFB, South Carolina
18. November 2001 - December 2002, Deputy Chief of Staff for Air and Space Operations, Headquarters U.S. Air Force, Washington, D.C.
19. December 2002 - July 2006, Deputy Commander, Headquarters U.S. European Command, Stuttgart, Germany

== Flight information ==
- Rating: Command pilot
- Flight hours: More than 3,600, including 430 combat hours over Vietnam, Cambodia, Laos, Iraq and Bosnia.
- Aircraft flown: C-20, O-2, G-35 Gulf Stream, T-37, T-38, F16 and F-15

== Awards and decorations ==
US Air Force Command Pilot Badge
Joint Chiefs of Staff Badge
United States European Command Badge

Personal decorations
	Defense Distinguished Service Medal with bronze oak leaf cluster
	Air Force Distinguished Service Medal
	Defense Superior Service Medal
Width-44 crimson ribbon with a pair of width-2 white stripes on the edges	Legion of Merit with bronze oak leaf cluster
	Distinguished Flying Cross with bronze oak leaf cluster
	Meritorious Service Medal with bronze oak leaf cluster
	Air Medal with silver oak leaf cluster
	Aerial Achievement Medal
	Air Force Commendation Medal
Unit awards
	Presidential Unit Citation with bronze oak leaf cluster
	Joint Meritorious Unit Award with two bronze oak leaf clusters
	Air Force Outstanding Unit Award with Valor device and silver oak leaf cluster
	Air Force Organizational Excellence Award with four bronze oak leaf clusters
State awards
	State Department Superior Honor Award
	Defense Intelligence Agency Director's Award
Service and campaign medals
	Combat Readiness Medal
Width=44 scarlet ribbon with a central width-4 golden yellow stripe, flanked by pairs of width-1 scarlet, white, Old Glory blue, and white stripes	National Defense Service Medal with two bronze service stars
	Armed Forces Expeditionary Medal
	Vietnam Service Medal with bronze service star
	Southwest Asia Service Medal with bronze service star
	Global War on Terrorism Expeditionary Medal
	Global War on Terrorism Service Medal
	Armed Forces Service Medal
	Humanitarian Service Medal
Service, training, and marksmanship awards
	Air Force Overseas Short Tour Service Ribbon
	Air Force Overseas Long Tour Service Ribbon with three bronze oak leaf clusters
	Air Force Expeditionary Service Ribbon with gold frame
	Air Force Longevity Service Award with silver and two bronze oak leaf clusters
	Small Arms Expert Marksmanship Ribbon
	Air Force Training Ribbon
Foreign awards
	French National Order of Merit, Commandeur Medal
	Gold Cross of Honor of the German Armed Forces
	Vietnam Gallantry Cross Unit Citation
	NATO Medal for Former Yugoslavia
	Inter-American Defense Board Medal with silver star
	Vietnam Campaign Medal
National Guard awards
	North Dakota Distinguished Service Medal

=== Other achievements ===
- Honorary Doctorate of Laws, North Dakota State University

== Effective dates of promotion ==
Promotions
Insignia	Rank	Date
	General	1 January 2003
	Lieutenant General	12 January 2000
	Major General	1 September 1998
	Brigadier General	1 February 1996
	Colonel	1 March 1991
	Lieutenant Colonel	1 February 1986
	Major	24 October 1980
	Captain	3 February 1975
	First Lieutenant	3 August 1972
	Second Lieutenant	3 February 1971
