= 603rd Air Control Squadron =

603d Air Control Squadron
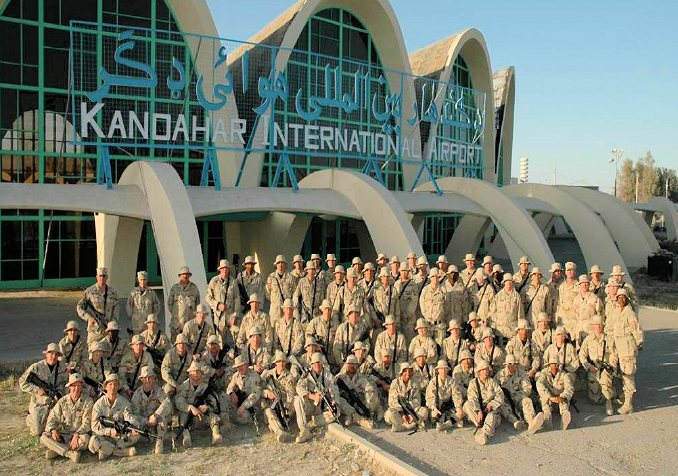
- Members of the squadron deployed to Kandahar in 2003
- Country: United States
- Branch: United States Air Force
- Type: Control of strike aircraft
- Part of: United States Air Forces in Europe
- Garrison/HQ: Aviano Air Base
- Nickname(s): Logrollers (early), Scorpions
- Motto(s): Control the Fight; Videmus Omnia Latin "We See All"; Fide et Animo (Latin) "By Faith and Spirit"
- Decorations: Air Force Outstanding Unit Award

Insignia
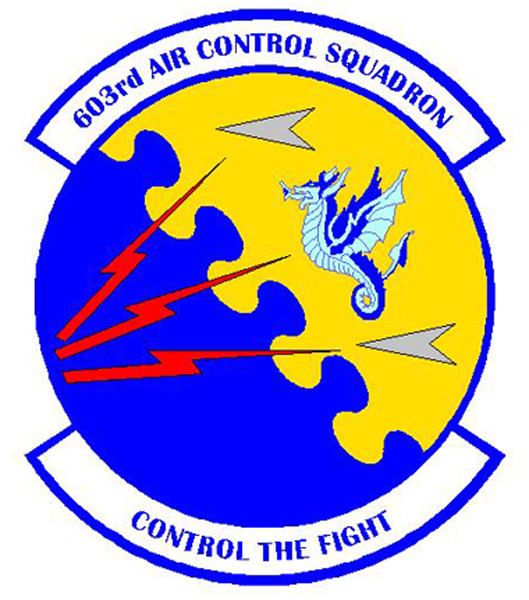
- 603d Air Control Squadron emblem

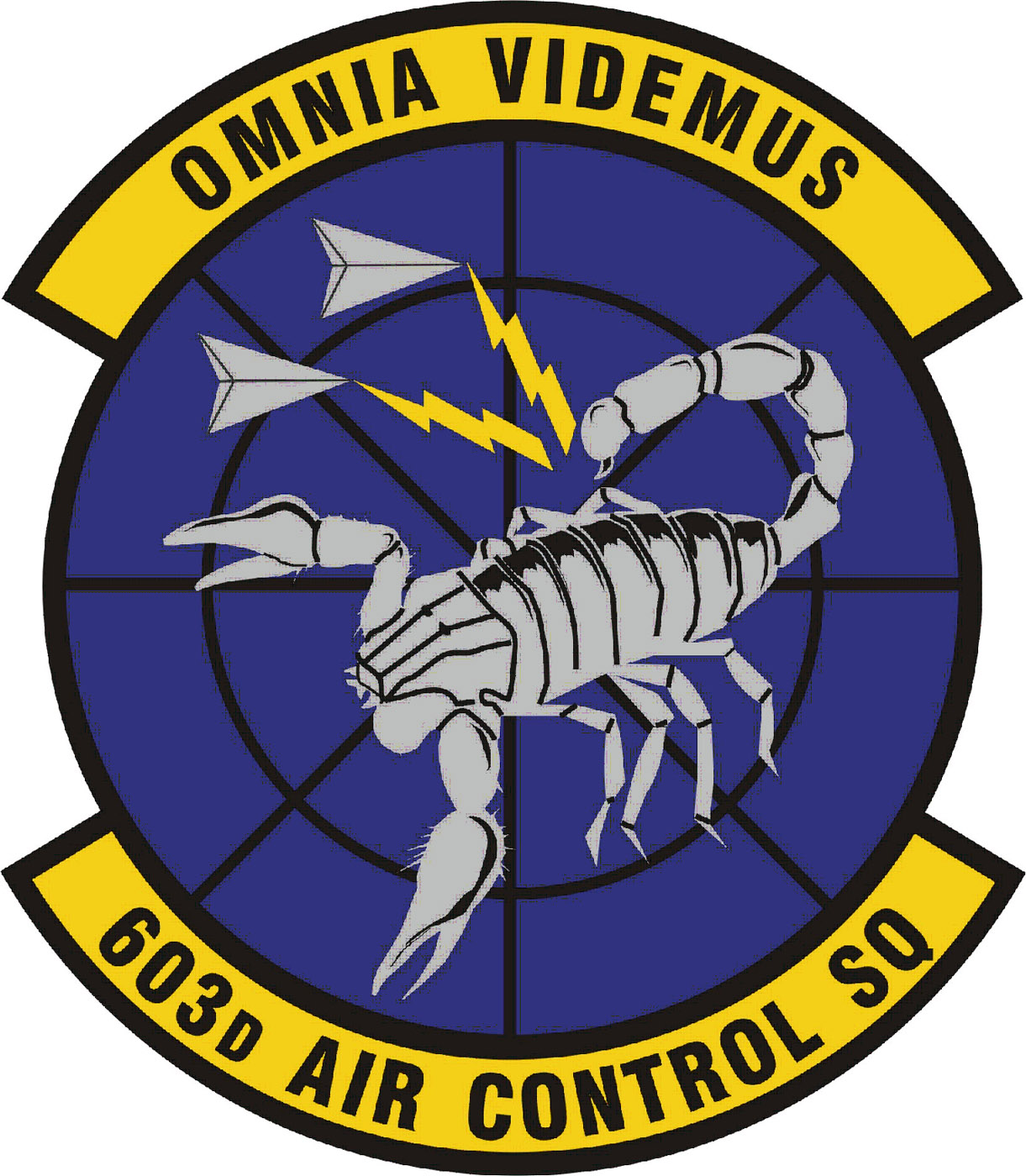
- 603d Air Control Squadron emblem

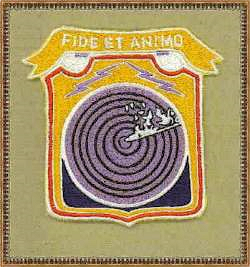
- Patch with 603d Aircraft Control & Warning Squadron emblem c. 1950

The 603d Air Control Squadron is an inactive United States Air Force unit. It was last assigned to the 31st Fighter Wing at Aviano Air Base, Italy. It was inactivated in 2013.

== Mission ==
The specified mission of the 603 ACS was to operate a mobile unit capable of providing radar control and surveillance within a designated area, to collect, display, and disseminate information of aerial activity and to provide radar coverage for the control of air forces. The squadron was further tasked to provide radar control for friendly aircraft in an offensive role against ground targets, and in a defensive mission against airborne threats, as directed.

== History ==
=== WWII ===
The 603d can trace its history to the beginnings of World War II with the formation of the 555th Signal Aircraft Warning Battalion on 9 June 1942 at Drew Field, Florida. The 555th participated in the D-Day invasion of Normandy, 6 June 1945. In July 1946, the 555th became the 501st Aircraft Control and Warning Group. Its four Companies (A, B, C, D) became the 601st, 602d, 603d and 604th Tactical Control Squadrons respectively. But almost a year after, 603d personnel were transferred to the other squadrons and the unit was inactivated. By 25 September 1947 the 501st Aircraft Control and Warning Battalion and its units were inactivated. The battalion spent 3 years on the European continent and earned five "Campaign Streamers" for: Normandy, Northern France, Ardennes Alsace, Central Europe, and Rhineland.

=== The Cold War Era ===
Heightening tensions with Russia and the beginning of The Cold War saw the reactivation of the 603d Tactical Control Squadron under the 7400th Air Force Communications Wing at Hof, West Germany on 25 May 1948.

On 1 December 1948 it was redesignated the 603d Aircraft Control and Warning Squadron, under direct control of the 7402d Aircraft Control and Warning Group. Its mission was to provide early warning radar and direction-finding network to support tactical air operations of USAFE and to provide navigational aids to friendly aircraft.

The main force of the unit's capabilities were witnessed during the 1948–49 Berlin Airlift. On 10 June 1949 the 603d realigned under the 501st Aircraft Control and Warning Group and on 18 Nov. 1960 it was again realigned under the 86th Air Division where it remained until it was once again inactivated on 25 June 1965.

Redesignated 603d Tactical Control Squadron on 29 June 1973. the unit was again officially reactivated, this time subordinate to the 601st Tactical Control Group. During the next 10 years the 603d distinguished itself by providing high quality radar coverage and command and control functions both in-garrison and during NATO exercises.

== Emblem ==
=== Description/Blazon ===
On a disc Azure, a stylized compass rose throughout bearing a scorpion bendwise sinister Argent (Silver Gray) garnished Sable above the scorpion's tail are two lightning bolts bendwise Or ending in two flight symbols fesswise of the second, all within a narrow border Black.

Attached above the disc, a Yellow scroll edged with a narrow Black border and inscribed "OMNIA VIDEMUS" in Black letters.

Attached below the disc, a Yellow scroll edged with a narrow Black border and inscribed "603D AIR CONTROL SQ" in Black letters.

=== Emblem significance ===
Ultramarine blue and Air Force yellow are the Air Force colors. Blue alludes to the sky, the primary theater of Air Force operations. Yellow refers to the sun and the excellence required of Air Force personnel. The lightning bolts represent the command and control function of the squadron. The scorpion is merciless and a fierce creature that in Greek mythology was summoned by the gods to punish wrongdoers and act as guardian and protector. Scorpions are known for their impenetrable defenses and for their ability to lure opponents into underestimating their resilience and determination. The flight symbols are for the flying units with which the squadron executes its air control mission.

== Lineage ==
- Formed as the 603d Aircraft Control and Warning Squadron on 31 December 1945 from Company C, 555th Signal Aircraft Warning Battalion (Separate)

Redesignated 603d Tactical Control Squadron c. 5 June 1946
Redesignated 603d Aircraft Control and Warning Squadron on 1 December 1948
Inactivated on 25 June 1965

- Redesignated 603d Tactical Control Squadron

Activated on 29 June 1973
Inactivated on 29 September 1986

- Activated on 1 July 1991

Redesignated 603d Air Control Squadron on 31 March 1992
9 August 2012
Inactivated c. 31 January 2013

=== Assignments ===
- 501st Tactical Control Group, 31 December 1945 – 25 September 1947
- Unknown, May 1948
- 7400th Air Force Composite Wing 1 July 1948
- 7402d Aircraft Control and Warning Group, 1 December 1948
- 501st Tactical Control Group (later 501st Tactical Control Wing), 10 June 1949 (attached to Tactical Control Wing, Provisional c. 1 July 1955 – c. 18 December 1957)
- 86th Air Division, 18 November 1960 – 25 June 1965
- 601st Tactical Control Group, 29 June 1973
- 601st Tactical Control Wing, 1 June 1985 – 29 June 1986
- 601st Tactical Control Wing, 1 July 1991
- 86th Operations Group, c. 31 March 1992
- 401st Operations Group, 1 January 1994
- 31st Operations Group, 1 April 1994 – c. 31 January 2013

=== Stations ===
- Neustadt Aisch Airport, Germany, 31 December 1945
- Hof Air Station, Germany, 5 May 1948
- Giebelstadt Air Station, Germany, c. June 1950
- Langerkopf, Germany, c. January 1954 – 25 June 1965
- Fishbach, Germany 1969–1973 Det 28 renamed 603 on move to Grunstadt
- Gruenstadt Air Station, Germany, 29 June 1973
- Sembach Air Base, Germany, 15 October 1973
- Mehlingen, Germany, 30 July 1978
- Sembach Air Base, Germany, 1 April 1979
- Aviano Air Base, Italy, 1 January 1994 – c. 31 January 2013

=== Equipment ===
- AN/TPS-75
- AN/TPS-43
- AN/TYQ-23
- AN/TSC-60(V1) and (V4)
- AN/TRC-87B
- AN/TSQ-91 4 Cell
- AN/TSC-100A
- AN/TSC-94A
- AN/TRC 97
- AN/TRC-170
- AN/GRC-239
