= 57th Rescue Squadron =

57th Rescue Squadron

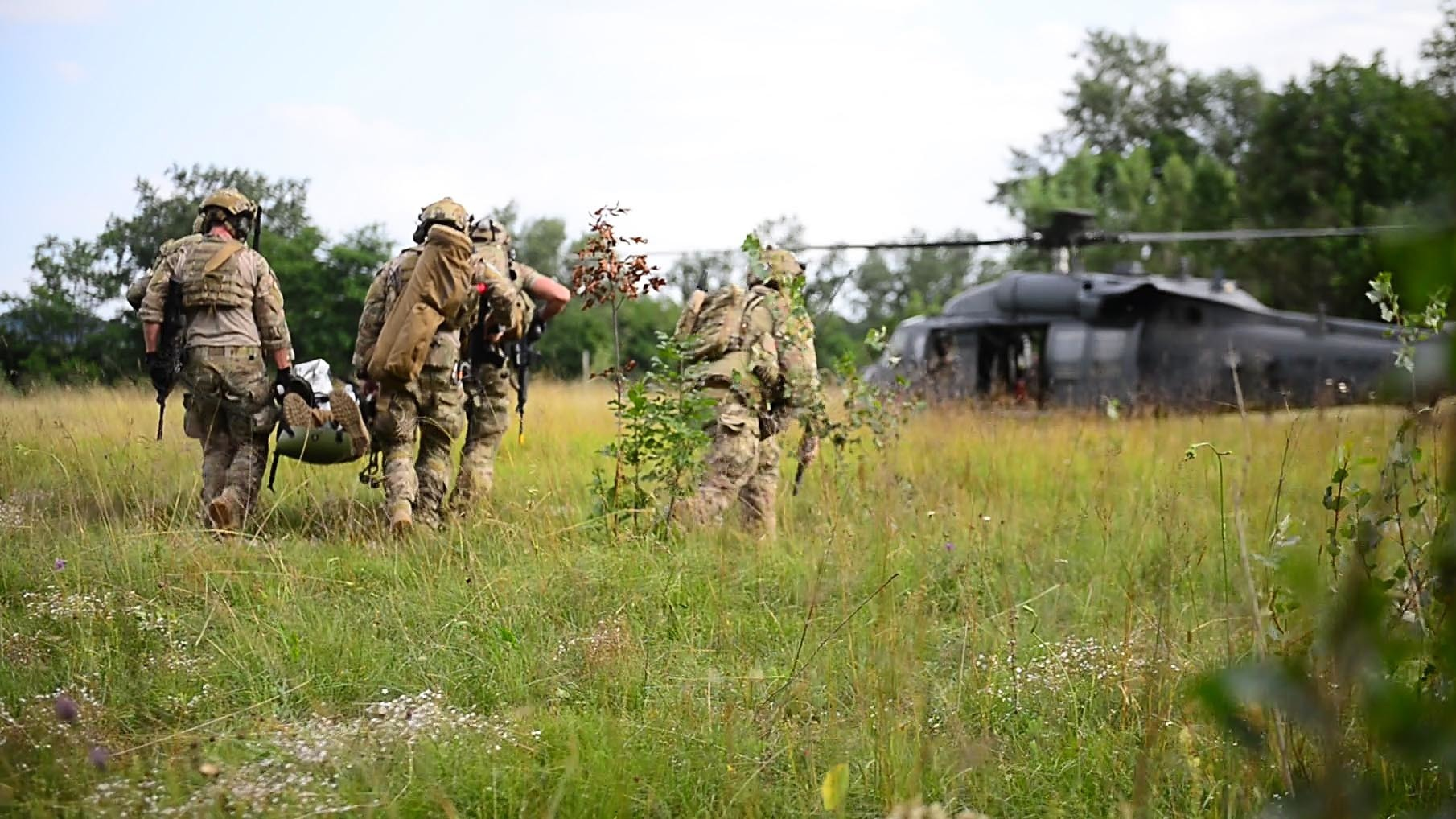
- 57th Rescue Squadron Pararescuemen carry a patient to a 56th Rescue Squadron helicopter during an exercise in 2020
- Active: 1952–1972; 2015–present
- Country: United States
- Branch: United States Air Force
- Role: Search and rescue
- Size: 35 officers and airmen
- Part of: United States Air Forces in Europe - Air Forces Africa
- Garrison/HQ: Aviano Air Base, Italy
- Mottos: Honor and Bravery
- Decorations: Meritorious Unit Award; Navy Meritorious Unit Citation; Air Force Outstanding Unit Award

Insignia
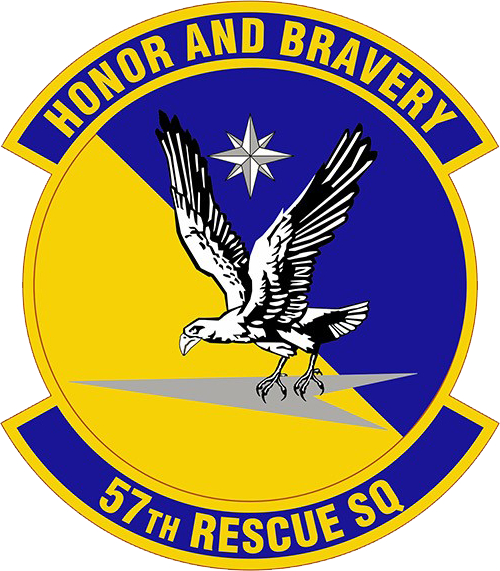
- 57th Rescue Squadron emblem (Note: Approved 23 December 2015.)

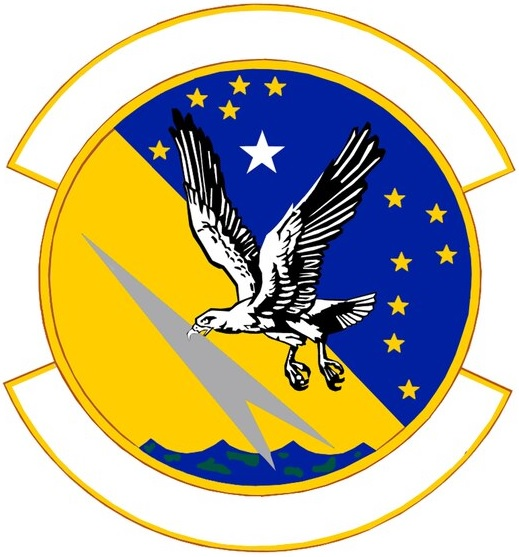
- 57th Aerospace Rescue and Recovery Squadron emblem (Note: Approved 31 July 1969.)

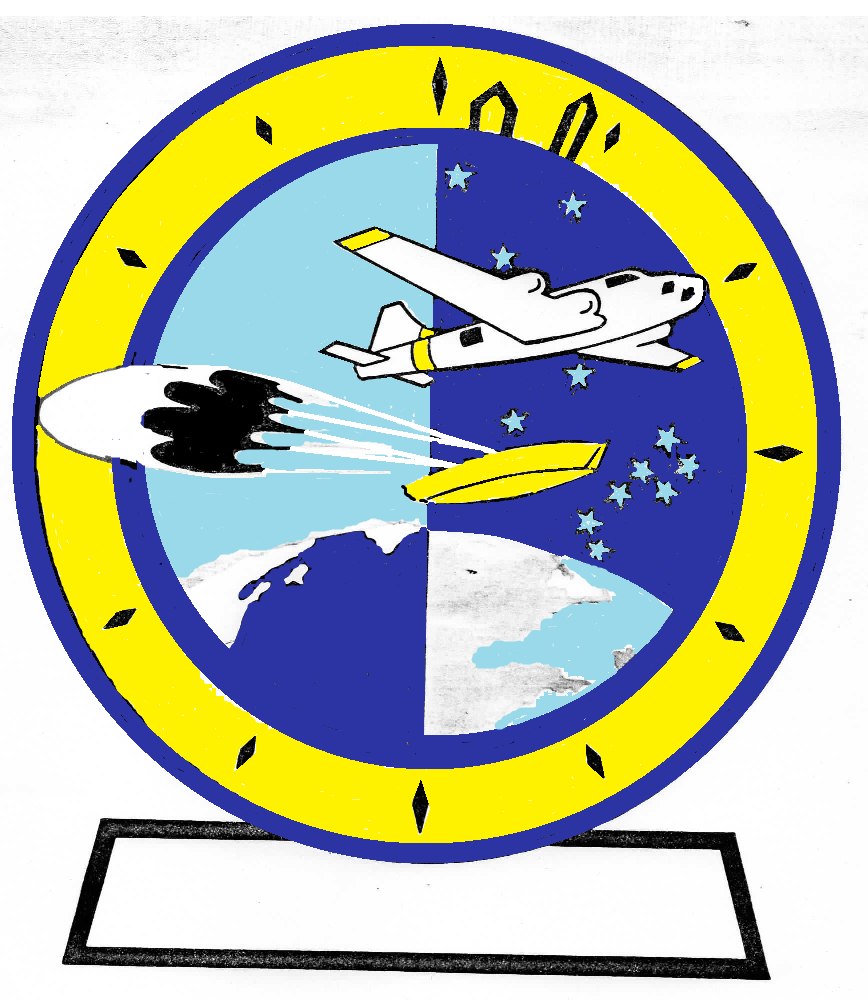
- 57th Air Rescue Squadron emblem

The 57th Rescue Squadron is part of the 31st Operations Group, 31st Fighter Wing at Aviano Air Base, Italy. As part of the 31st Operations Group it conducts pararescue operations in support of higher command directives, at times utilizing HH-60G Pave Hawk and Lockheed HC-130 Hercules aircraft flown by other rescue squadrons such as the 56th Rescue Squadron, also based at Aviano. The 57th Rescue Squadron is a combat-ready squadron of pararescue personnel capable of performing combat rescue and personnel retrieval missions in theaters of operations worldwide. The squadron does not operate any aircraft.

== Mission ==
The 57th Rescue Squadron is a combat-ready search and rescue squadron composed of USAF Pararescue and Survival, Evasion, Resistance and Escape personnel, capable of executing all-weather search and rescue missions day or night in hostile environments in support of USAFE, USEUCOM, and NATO operations. It employs advanced search and rescue equipment. The squadron is capable of deploying to any theater of operations in the world.

== History ==
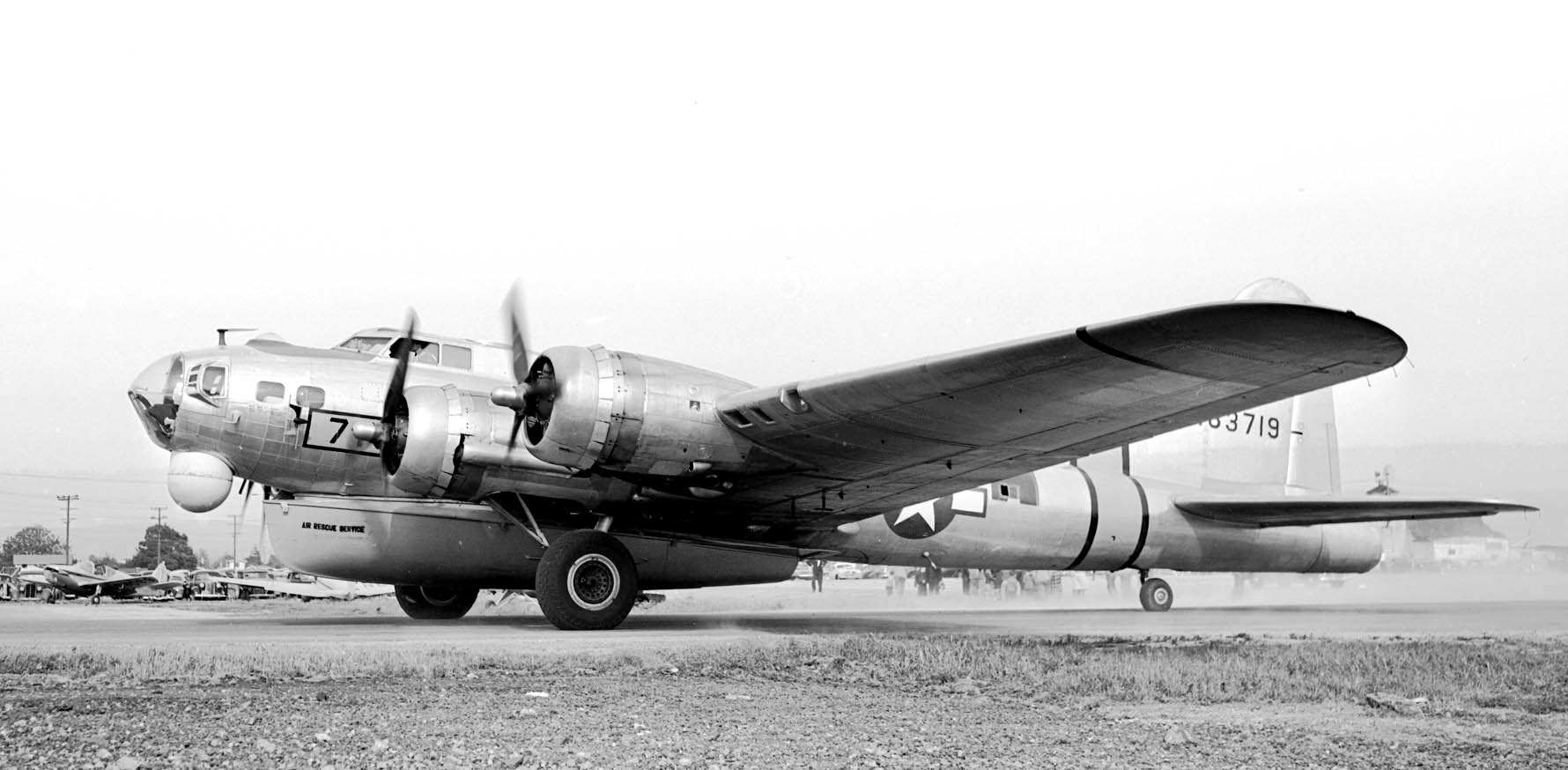
Air Rescue Service SB-17H

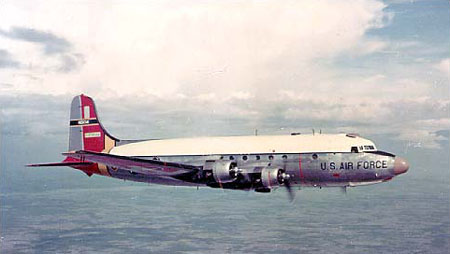
Air Rescue Service SC-54D in flight

The squadron was first activated at Lajes Field in the Azores in November 1952 as the 57th Air Rescue Squadron in a reorganization of Air Rescue Service. The 7th Air Rescue Squadron at Wheelus Field, Libya was expanded into a group and each of its remotely stationed lettered flights was replaced by a new squadron. The 57th replaced Flight B of the 7th Squadron and assumed its personnel and equipment. The squadron mission was to intercept aircraft in distress while crossing the Atlantic and to escort them back to Lajes Field. The 57th also provided search and rescue for both downed aircraft and for ships.

One of the squadron's most notable achievements occurred in 1959, when a Portuguese ship, the SS Arnel, which had struck rocks near the island of Santa Maria. The squadron evacuated 48 persons from the Arnel.

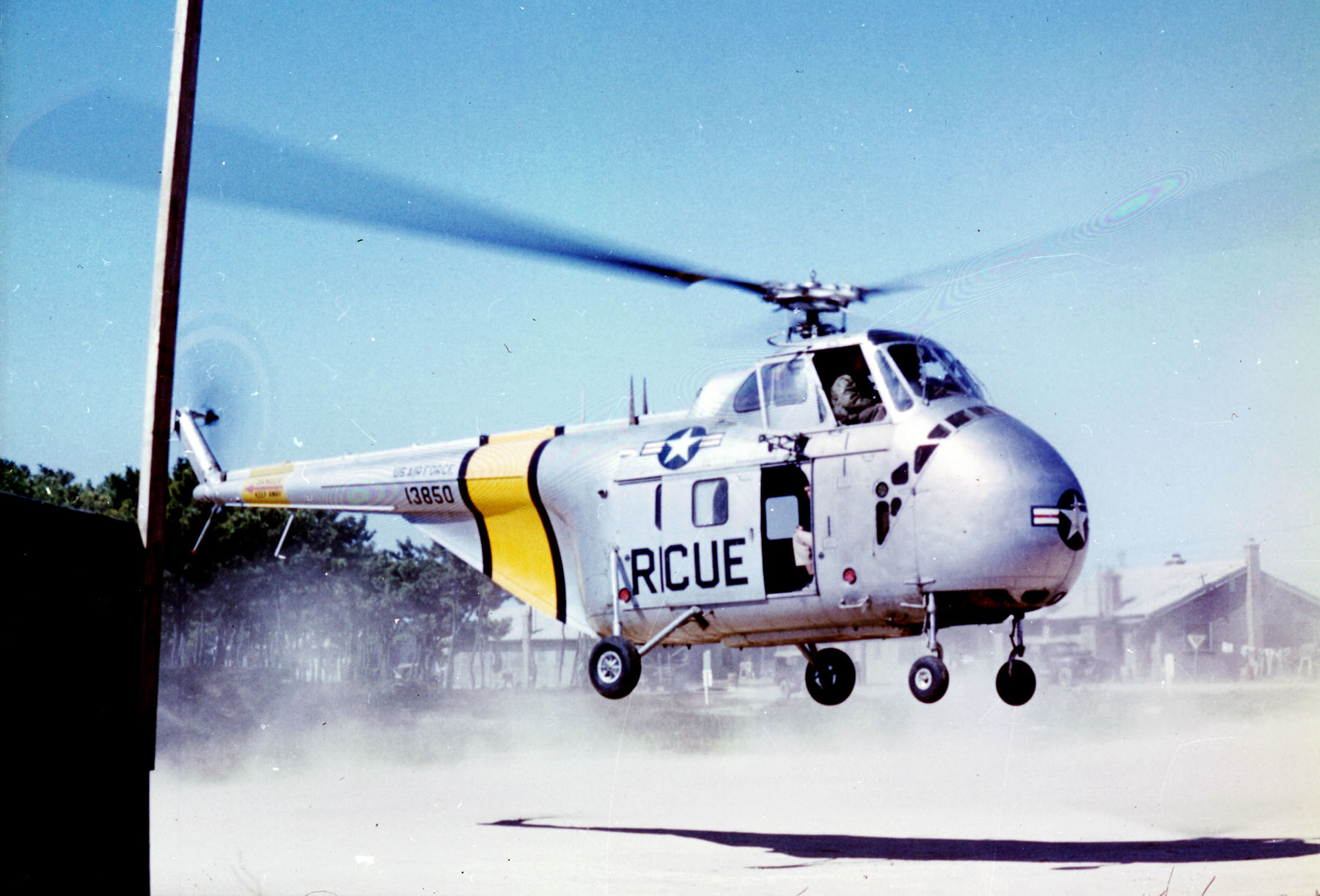
Air Rescue Service SH-19A

By the early 1960s the squadron had assumed the mission of providing support for Project Gemini and Project Apollo space missions. To reflect this mission, it was renamed the 57th Air Recovery Squadron in July 1965. The following January Air Rescue Service became Aerospace Rescue and Recovery Service and all of its squadrons were renamed, no matter their mission. The squadron was inactivated at Lajes in late 1972, when the Portuguese Air Force assumed the mid-Atlantic rescue mission.

The 57th was reactivated as the 57th Rescue Squadron at Lakenheath in February 2015. Personnel for the squadron came from the 56th Rescue Squadron, with no additional manpower or aircraft. Aircrews and the HH-60G Pave Hawk helicopters remained in the 56th Squadron. The separation of pararescue airmen into a separate unit "align[ed] the personnel recovery function within United States Air Forces Europe to the standard Air Force structure," officials said. Creating two rescue squadrons at Lakenheath is intended to replicate combat conditions because pararescuemen frequently deploy separately from their rescue helicopters and planes. The 56th was the last squadron in the Air Force to split its pararescue and flying functions into two squadrons.

In May 2018, the 57th and its sister squadron, the 56th RQS, relocated to Aviano Air Base, Italy.

== Lineage ==
- Constituted as the 57th Air Rescue Squadron on 17 October 1952

Activated on 14 November 1952
Redesignated 57th Air Recovery Squadron on 1 July 1965
Redesignated 57th Aerospace Rescue and Recovery Squadron on 8 January 1966
Inactivated on 1 December 1972

- Redesignated 57th Rescue Squadron on 5 February 2015

Activated on 18 February 2015

== Assignments ==
- 7th Air Rescue Group: 14 November 1952 (attached to United States Air Forces in Europe until 1 August 1954, then to Atlantic Division, Military Air Transport Service)
- 9th Air Rescue Group: 8 September 1955
- Air Rescue Service (later Aerospace Rescue and Recovery Service): 24 June 1958
- Atlantic Aerospace Rescue and Recovery Center (later 40th Aerospace Rescue and Recovery Wing): (Note: The Atlantic Aerospace Rescue and Recovery Center was a MAC unit at Ramstein Air Base, Germany, performing missions in support of USAFE. The AFHRA lineage statement for the squadron erroneously indicates a reassignment on the date the center was redesignated as a wing.) 8 January 1966 – 1 January 1972
- 48th Operations Group: 18 February 2015
- 31st Operations Group: 1 July 2018 – present

== Stations ==
- Lajes Field, Azores, Portugal, 14 November 1952 – 1 December 1972
- RAF Lakenheath, England, 18 February 2015
- Aviano Air Base, Italy, 1 July 2018 – present

== Aircraft ==
- Boeing SB-17 Flying Fortress
- Douglas SC-54 (later HC-54D)
- Sikorsky SH-19
- Lockheed HC-130 Hercules
