= Aviano Air Base =

Military airfield in Italy

- Aeroporto Pagliano e Gori di Aviano
- Near Aviano, Friuli-Venezia Giulia in Italy
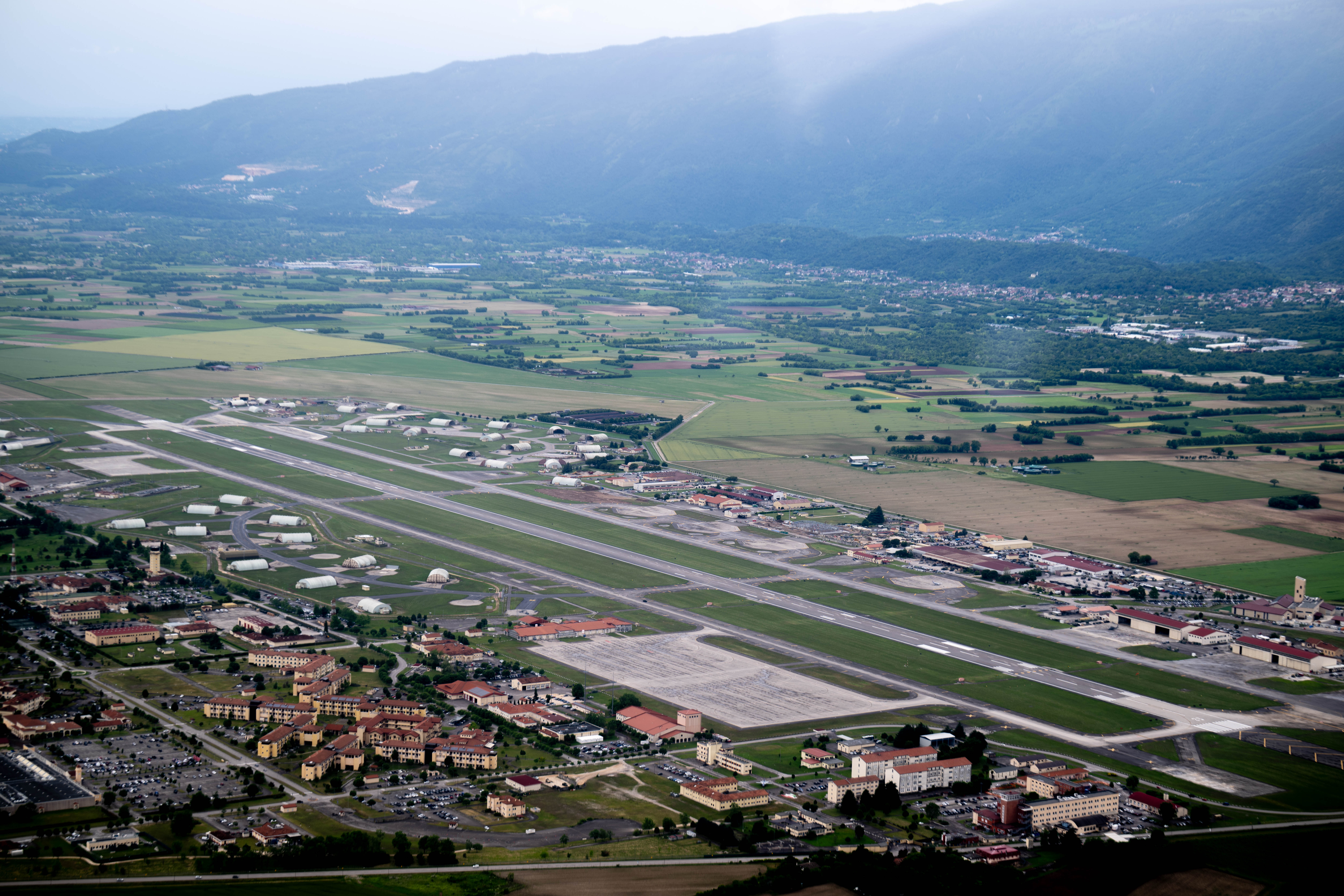
- Aviano Air Base in 2025

Site information
- Type: Used by the US and Italian air forces
- Owner: Ministry of Defence (Ministero della Difesa)
- Operator: Italian Air Force (Aeronautica Militare) US Air Force
- Controlled by: Italy
- Condition: Operational
- Website: www.aviano.af.mil

Location
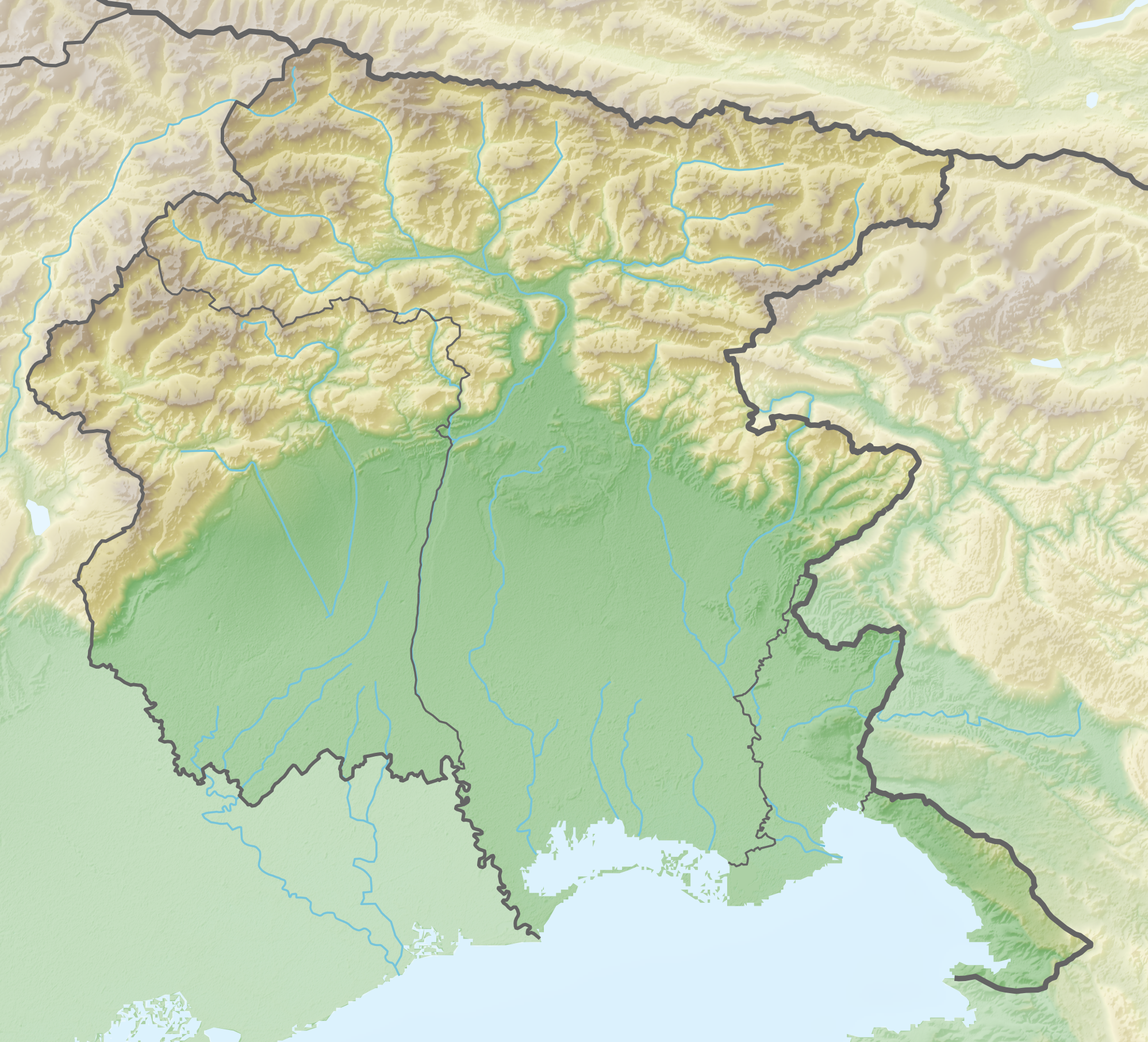
- Coordinates: 46°01′53″N 012°35′49″E

Site history
- Built: 1911
- In use: 1911–present (Italian Air Force); 1954–present (US Air Force)

Garrison information
- Current commander: Colonel Luca Crovatti
- Garrison: 31st Fighter Wing
- Occupants: 510th Fighter Squadron; 555th Fighter Squadron; 56th Rescue Squadron; 57th Rescue Squadron; 31st Aircraft Maintenance Squadron; 31st Security Forces Squadron; 510th Fighter Generation Squadron; 555th Fighter Generation Squadron

Airfield information
- Identifiers: IATA: AVB, ICAO: LIPA, WMO: 160360
- Elevation: 125.8 metres (413 ft) AMSL
Runways
Direction	Length and surface
05/23	2,987 metres (9,800 ft) Asphalt
- Source: SkyVector Aeronautical Charts

Aviano Air Base (IATA: AVB, ICAO: LIPA) (Italian: Base aerea di Aviano) is a base in northeastern Italy, in the Friuli-Venezia Giulia region. It is located in the Aviano municipality, at the foot of the Carnic Pre-Alps or Southern Carnic Alps, about 15 kilometres (9.3 mi) from Pordenone.

The Italian Air Force has ownership, and administrative and military control of the base. It hosts the U.S. Air Force's 31st Fighter Wing and per nuclear sharing is one of six active air bases in five European countries with B61 nuclear bombs in underground WS3 Weapon Storage and Security System inside aircraft shelters.

The 31st Fighter Wing is the only U.S. fighter wing south of the Alps. The 31st Fighter Wing is made up of two General Dynamics F-16 Fighting Falcon fighter squadrons, the 555th Fighter Squadron and the 510th Fighter Squadron, allowing it to fly both attack and defensive missions.

== History ==
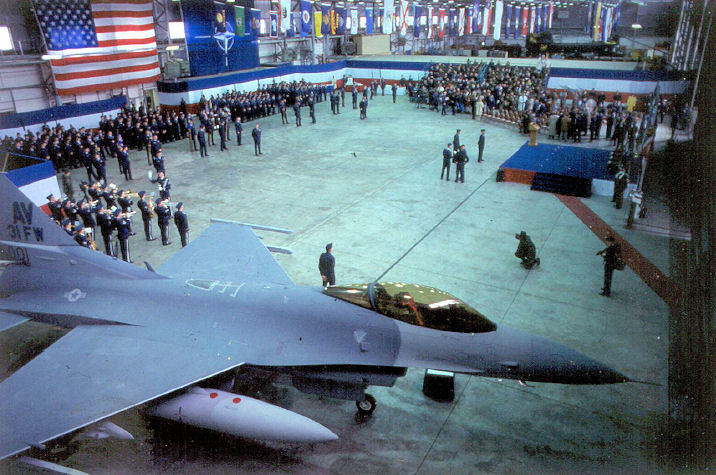
Activation ceremony for the 31st Fighter Wing at Aviano Air Base. 1 April 1994

Aviano Air Base was established by the Italian government in 1911 as the first airport in Italy, and was later used as training base for Italian pilots and construction facility for aircraft parts. During World War I, Italy used the airfield in missions against the Austro-Hungarian and German armies. At that time, two Italian aviators, Captain Maurizio Pagliano and Lieutenant Luigi Gori, conducted an unauthorized and unsuccessful but heroic air raid on the Austro-Hungarian naval yards in Pula, in what is now Croatia. In their honor, the base's name was changed to Aeroporto Pagliano e Gori in 1919. During the war the airfield was also overrun by the Austro-German army between November 1917 and November 1918. After World War I, the airfield was again used as a training base.

During World War II, both the Italian Air Force and the German Luftwaffe flew missions from Aeroporto Pagliano e Gori. British forces captured the base in 1945; they conducted air operations there until 1947, when the Italian Air Force resumed operational use of the airport.

The USAF first arrived in Aviano in the winter of 1954. The 40th Tactical Group was created 1 April 1966. The 1976 earthquake caused no damage.

=== Hurricane Andrew and Balkan operations ===
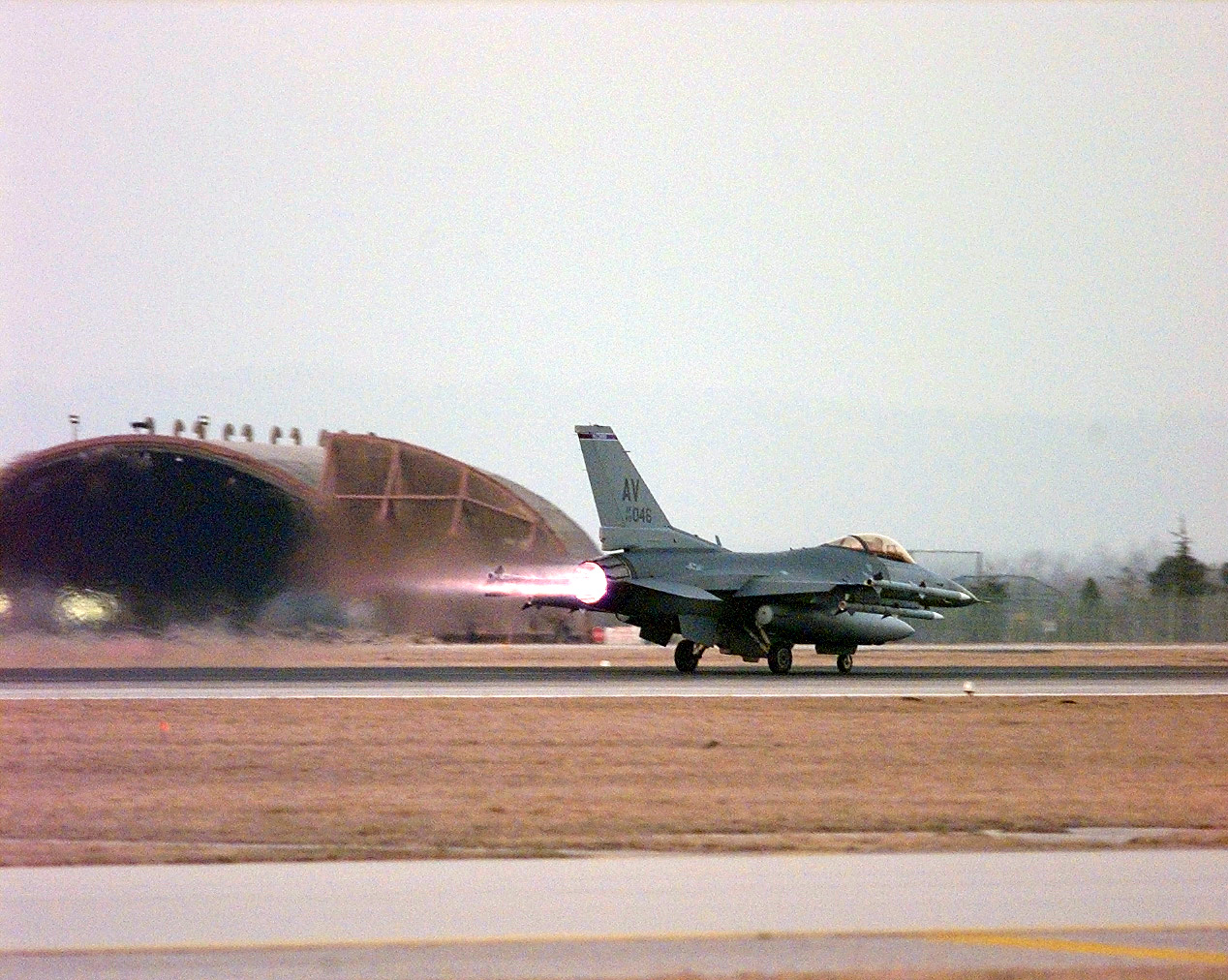
31st Fighter Wing F-16 Fighting Falcon takes off from Aviano Air Base for an air strike mission in support of NATO Operation Allied Force on March 24, 1999.

As part of the most extensive restructuring since the Air Force became a separate service, Tactical Air Command was inactivated and Air Combat Command was activated and the 31st Tactical Fighter Wing was redesignated to its current name, the 31st Fighter Wing.

To avoid losing the wing's heritage and history as the highest scoring Army Air Force unit in the Mediterranean Theater in WWII, the impressive combat record in the Vietnam War and a number of significant firsts they produced in the early years of the Air Force, the 31st Fighter Wing was chosen to move rather than fade into obscurity. On 1 April 1994, the 31st Fighter Wing inactivated at Homestead AFB and subsequently activated at Aviano Air Base, Italy, in place of the 401st Fighter Wing.

The 31st Fighter Wing received two new squadrons at that time, the 555th and 510th Fighter Squadrons, along with their Block-40 F-16s. The wing immediately became involved with events in Bosnia in May 1994 as part of Operation Deny Flight. In June 1995, a massive search and rescue operation took place to extract Captain Scott O'Grady of the 555th Fighter Squadron who was shot down over Bosnian-Serb controlled territory in Bosnia. A U.S. Marine Corps CH-53 picked him up after he evaded capture for six days.

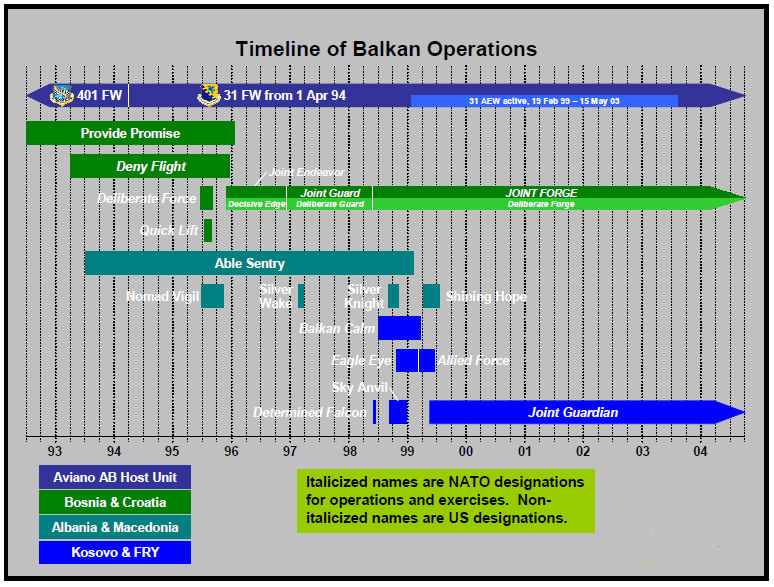
Timeline of Balkan Operations, 31st Fighter Wing

In August and September, Operation Deliberate Force began and the 31st Fighter Wing conducted air strikes against Bosnian Serbs to give the Muslim forces an upper hand in the conflict. Peacekeeping operations continued in the Balkans through the end of 2004, when the European Union assumed responsibility for the region.

In 1999, U.S. Air Forces in Europe activated the 31st Air Expeditionary Wing-Noble Anvil at Aviano for Operation Allied Force in Kosovo, which was not authorized by the UN Security Council. Assigned under a joint task force, the 31st Air Expeditionary Wing flew from Aviano and joined NATO allies in a 78-day air campaign against the Federal Republic of Yugoslavia. From 24 March to 10 June 1999, the 31st Air Expeditionary Wing, the largest expeditionary wing in Air Force history flew nearly 9,000 combat sorties and accumulated almost 40,000 hours of combat service over the skies of Kosovo, Serbia and the rest of the Balkans in support of NATO operations. The wing accomplished much during OAF as the two permanently assigned flying squadrons, the 510th and 555th, flew more than 2,400 combined sorties and more than 10,000 combat hours.

=== Operations in Iraq, Afghanistan and Libya ===
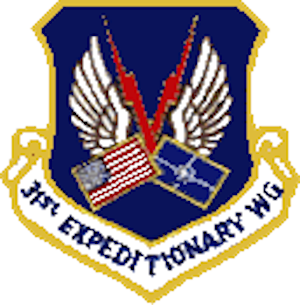
Emblem of the 31st Air Expeditionary Wing

In 2000, the wing began deployments in support of the Expeditionary Air Force. From March to September 2000, the 510th and 555th Fighter Squadrons conducted back-to-back deployments to Ahmad al-Jaber AB, Kuwait, in support of Operation Southern Watch. While at Al Jaber, the squadrons flew more than 400 combat sorties.

From June through December 2001, the fighter squadrons deployed combat search and rescue capabilities three times and helped enforce the no-fly zone over Iraq.

From August to December 2002, the 510th Fighter Squadron and 603rd Air Control Squadron returned to Southwest Asia. The two squadrons supported Operation Enduring Freedom.

Simultaneously, the 555th deployed personnel and aircraft to Decimomannu Air Base, Sardinia, while the runway at Aviano was closed for repairs.

The wing's support of Operation Iraqi Freedom began in late 2003. Aviano served as the launch point for airborne/air-land insertion of airborne forces opening a second front in northern Iraq. During that time, the wing secured, bedded and fed more than 2,300 Army and Air Force personnel. The operation, the largest airborne operation since 1989, constituted 62 missions, transporting 2,146 passengers and 2,433.7 tons of cargo.

Since the beginning of combat operations in Iraq, forces from the wing have been on regular combat rotations into the region. In late 2003, the wing's 603rd Air Control Squadron became the first unit from the wing to deploy to Iraq. They also relocated their entire operation from Baghdad International Airport to Balad Air Base. Under combat conditions, the squadron transferred $73 million in equipment and more than 100 personnel with 20 convoys. On 10 April 2004, insurgents launched a mortar attack on Balad, killing Airman 1st Class Antoine Holt and injuring two other 603rd Air Control Squadron members. Airman Holt's death constituted the 31st Fighter Wing's first combat fatality since the Vietnam War.

The 31st Fighter Wing continued deploying forces in support of Operation Iraqi Freedom and Operation Enduring Freedom, with more than one-third of the wing deploying to support operations each year from 2003 to 2007.

In 2007, the 555th Fighter Squadron deployed to Kunsan Air Base in the Republic of Korea.

Since arriving at Aviano, the wing has also participated in numerous training exercises with international partners, including training deployments to Latvia, the Czech Republic, Romania, Bulgaria, Spain, Slovenia and Poland.

In March 2011, the 31st Fighter Wing played a major role in the United Nations' response to the crisis in Libya, known as Operation Odyssey Dawn, in enforcing no-fly zone. The wing hosted four flying units and more than 1,350 personnel during the 15-day operation, 17 to 31 March. It worked around the clock to launch 2,250 flying operations out of Aviano Air Base. As Operation Odyssey Dawn came to an end on 31 March, so began Operation Unified Protector, with NATO taking the lead until the operation's conclusion 31 October of that year.

Aviano F-16s again returned to the skies over Libya in June 2014. Due to significant fighting in Tripoli during the 2014 Libyan conflict the U.S embassy was evacuated. During a five-hour non-combatant evacuation operation, three F-16s launched from Aviano guarded the evacuation of American citizens as embassy staff and U.S Marines convoyed overland from Tripoli into Tunisia.

=== Cavalese cable-car disaster ===
In the Cavalese cable car disaster, on 3 February 1998, a U.S. Marine Corps EA-6B Prowler jet flying too low on a training exercise from Aviano Air Base severed a cable car's cable over the Alps at Cavalese, Italy, causing 20 deaths.

=== Imam rapito affair ===
On 4 November 2009, the conviction by an Italian court of 22 CIA agents, a U.S. Air Force colonel and two Italian SISMI secret agents confirmed the role of the Aviano Air Base in the kidnapping, on 17 February 2003, of Hassan Mustafa Osama Nasr, in the so-called "extraordinary rendition" program. The man, abducted in Milan by CIA agents, was taken to Aviano Air Base for interrogation before being transported via Ramstein Air Base in Germany to Alexandria, Egypt, and turned over to the custody of Egypt's State Security Intelligence.

== Infrastructure and facilities ==
- Area A1 contains a few of Aviano's support functions (such as the library and chapel) and the Department of Defense Dependents School for the base population's children.
- Area A2 contained a fitness center, dining facility, dormitories, thrift shop and a fire department but all facilities have been removed and it is now an empty enclosed area.
- Area C contains most of the 31st Civil Engineer Squadron's facilities.
- Area D contains a football field and picnic area.
- Area E contains the Carabinieri (Italian gendarmerie that enforces the law on the base) headquarters in this area. It contains also an Armed Forces Network station, military working dog kennels, and an Air Force Office of Special Investigations detachment.
- Area F is the flightline area, and is the largest area in Aviano. The complex contains the active runway and taxiways, as well as most of the base's facilities, which include a commissary and base exchange.

== Role and operations ==
=== 31st Fighter Wing ===
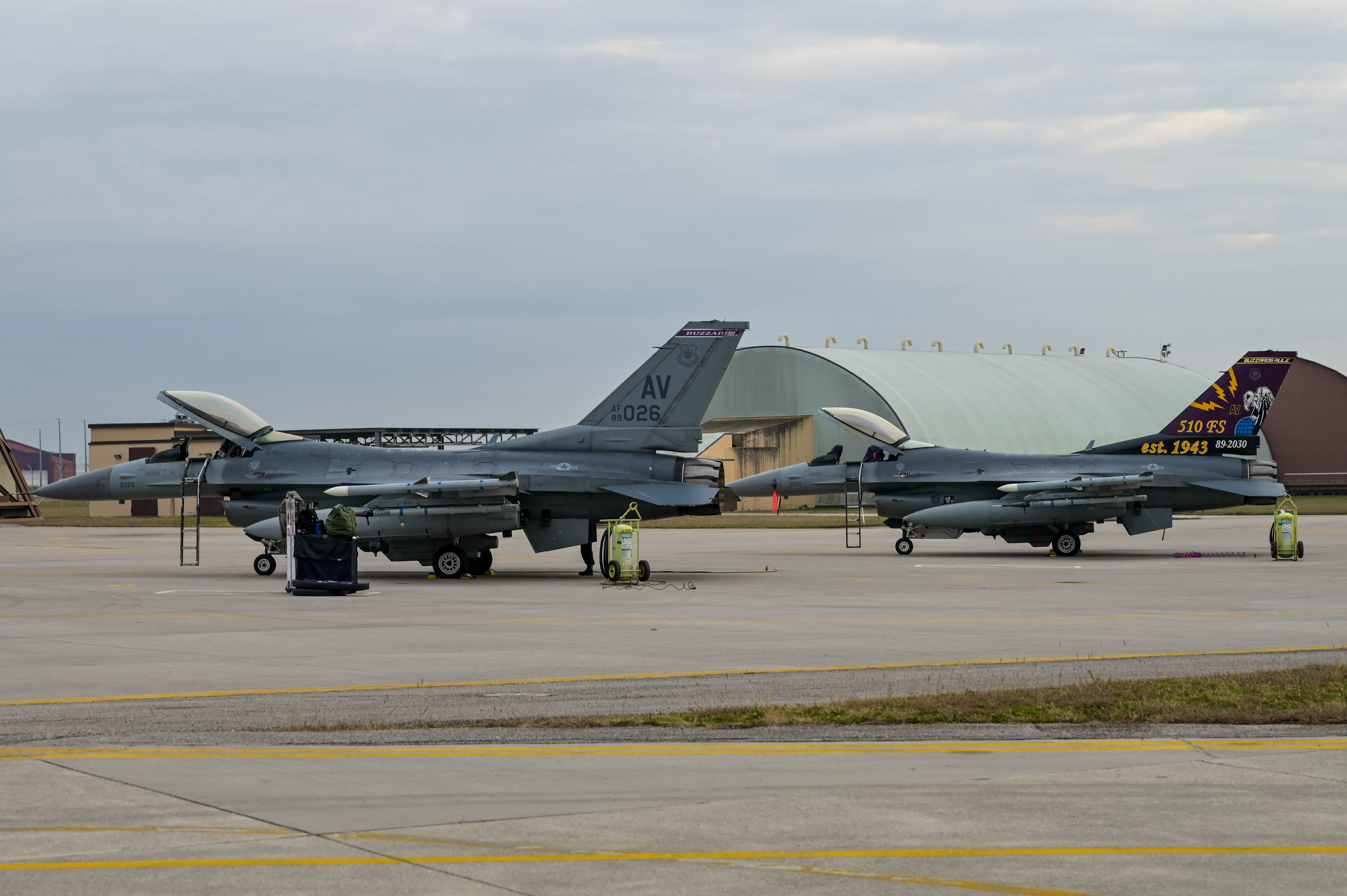
F-16C Fighting Falcons of the 510th Fighter Squadron, 31st Fighter Wing, at Aviano Air Base. 11 December 2023

The 31st Fighter Wing is made up of four groups, each consisting of several squadrons.

The 31st Operations Group ensures the combat readiness of two F-16CG squadrons, one air control squadron, and one operational support squadron conducting and supporting worldwide air operations. The group prepares fighter pilots, controllers, and support personnel to execute U.S. and NATO war plans and contingency operations. It trains, equips, plans, and provides weather, intelligence, standardization/evaluation, and command and control sustaining global flying operations.

The 31st Maintenance Group provides peacetime and combat maintenance and munitions control, and executive support for the 31st Fighter Wing, geographically separated units under the command and control of the wing, and units gained during advanced stages of readiness. The 31st MXG also responds to humanitarian and contingency logistics support requirements as directed by the Joint Chiefs of Staff through Headquarters U.S. Air Forces Europe to locations in Europe, Africa, and Southwest Asia.

The 31st Mission Support Group's goal is to provide infrastructure and service to support a premiere combat capability and quality of life to the 31st Fighter Wing, Aviano community and multiple geographically separated units.

The 31st Medical Group supports the readiness of 31st Fighter Wing and associated units throughout the Southern Region, ensuring the health of its community by providing optimal patient-focused medical care from internal, Department of Defense and Host Nation resources. The unit employs medical resources and preventive initiatives to ensure airmen remain mission ready to support the Expeditionary Air Force, U.S. and NATO objectives worldwide.

As of 2023, Aviano is one of six active air bases in five European countries with B61 nuclear bombs in underground WS3 Weapon Storage and Security System inside aircraft shelters; Ramstein Air Base has a vault but no nuclear weapons present and RAF Lakenheath s bunkers were being modernized.

== Based units ==
Flying and notable non-flying units based at Aviano Air Base.

=== United States Air Force ===
United States Air Forces in Europe - Air Forces Africa (USAFE-AFAFRICA)

- Third Air Force
  - 31st Fighter Wing
    - 31st Comptroller Squadron
    - 31st Operations Group
      - 31st Operations Support Squadron
      - 56th Rescue Squadron – HH-60W Jolly Green II
      - 57th Rescue Squadron
      - 510th Fighter Squadron – F-16C/D Fighting Falcon
      - 555th Fighter Squadron – F-16C/D Fighting Falcon
      - 606th Air Control Squadron
    - 31st Maintenance Group
      - 31st Aircraft Maintenance Squadron
      - 31st Maintenance Squadron
      - 31st Maintenance Operations Squadron
      - 31st Munitions Squadron
      - 510th Fighter Generation Squadron
      - 555th Fighter Generation Squadron
    - 31st Medical Group
      - 31st Aerospace Medicine Squadron
      - 31st Dental Squadron
      - 31st Medical Operations Squadron
      - 31st Medical Support Squadron
      - 31st Surgical Operations Squadron
    - 31st Mission Support Group
      - 31st Civil Engineer Squadron
      - 31st Communications Squadron
      - 31st Contracting Squadron
      - 31st Force Support Squadron
      - 31st Logistics Readiness Squadron
      - 31st Security Forces Squadron

=== Italian Air Force ===
Combat Forces Command

- Aviano Airport Command

== Education ==
The Department of Defense Education Activity (DoDEA) operates schools for children who are dependents of US military personnel. Aviano Elementary School and Aviano Middle High School are the two DoDEA schools on the property.

== Environment ==
Pest extermination is the responsibility of the 31st Civil Engineer Squadron.

== See also ==
- List of United States Air Force installations
- List of airports in Italy

Air bases with US nuclear weapon vaults in Europe:

- Ghedi Air Base, Italy
- Büchel Air Base, Germany
- Kleine Brogel Air Base, Belgium
- Volkel Air Base, NL
- Ramstein Air Base, Germany
- RAF Lakenheath, England
- Araxos Air Base, Greece
- Balikesir Air Base, Turkey
- Incirlik Air Base, Turkey
- Akıncı Air Base, Turkey
