= Offensive counter air =

Form of aerial warfare

Offensive counter-air (OCA) is a military term for the suppression of an enemy's military air power, primarily through ground attacks targeting enemy air bases: disabling or destroying parked aircraft, runways, fuel facilities, hangars, air traffic control facilities and other aviation infrastructure. Ground munitions like bombs are typically less expensive than more sophisticated air-to-air munitions, and a single ground munition can destroy or disable multiple aircraft in a very short time whereas aircraft already flying must typically be shot down one at a time. Enemy aircraft already flying also represent an imminent threat as they can usually fire back, and therefore destroying them before they can take off minimizes the risk to friendly aircraft.

Air-to-air operations conducted by fighter aircraft with the objective of clearing an airspace of enemy fighters known as combat air patrols can also be offensive counter-air missions, but they are seen as a comparatively slow and expensive way of achieving the final objective - air superiority. The opposite term is defensive counter air, primarily referring to the protection of territory, men and/or materiel against incursion by enemy aircraft, usually with a combination of ground-based surface-to-air missiles and anti-aircraft artillery but also through defensive combat air patrols.

== History ==
Offensive counter-air strikes have been used since World War I. The Teishin Shudan and Giretsu Kuteitai carried out two OCA raids in the Pacific theatre against B29s. In one measure the most successful single OCA mission to date was Operation Focus, the Israeli offensive that opened the Six-Day War of 1967, when the Heyl Ha'avir destroyed a large portion of the air power of Egypt, Syria, and Jordan, mostly on the ground, totaling roughly 600 airframes destroyed by a force of 200 aircraft. However, in sheer number of planes destroyed, the opening two weeks of Operation Barbarossa saw some 3-4,000 Russian planes destroyed in total. Other successful attacks include US counter-air operations in Korea in 1950 and 1953, French and British attacks during the Suez Crisis and many others. However, there have also been notable failures like Operation Chengiz Khan initiated by Pakistan during the Indo-Pakistani War of 1971 and Iraqi attacks on Iran.

Although OCA missions are often carried out via air strikes, they are not limited to aerial action. The Teishin Shudan and Giretsu Kuteitai commandos carried out two notable OCA raids during World War II, as did the British Long Range Desert Group. The Vietcong successfully destroyed a number of American aircraft with mortar fire during the Vietnam War, and more recently a Taliban raid in Afghanistan destroyed eight AV-8B Harriers.

The Swedish Air Force developed and used the Bas 60 and Bas 90 air base systems during the Cold War, as a suite of defensive measures against offensive counter air operations.

=== Weapons used ===
During the 1950s, the Cold War strategy of both NATO and the Warsaw Pact called for OCA to be carried out with tactical nuclear weapons, but by the mid-1960s, new policies of 'proportional response' brought about a return to conventional tactics. Beginning shortly before the Six-Day War, specialized weapons were developed for disrupting runways, which were further developed into munitions such as the BLU-107 Durandal anti-runway bomb (carried by USAF F-111Es), and the Hunting JP233 (carried by RAF Panavia Tornado aircraft), both used during the 1991 Gulf War.

After the UK signed an international accord in 1997, banning the production & use of anti-personnel mines, the JP233 was withdrawn from RAF service.
