= Bas 90 =

Class of Swedish airbases

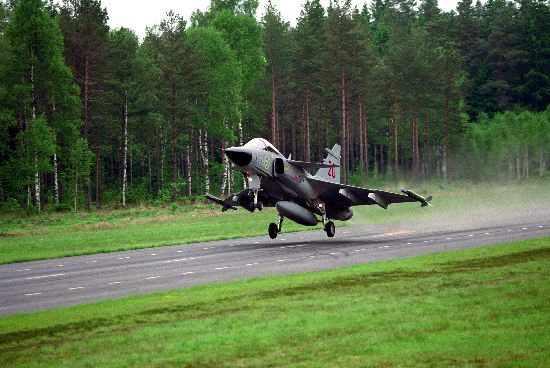
A JAS 39 Gripen taking off from a kortbana (short runway) located on public road

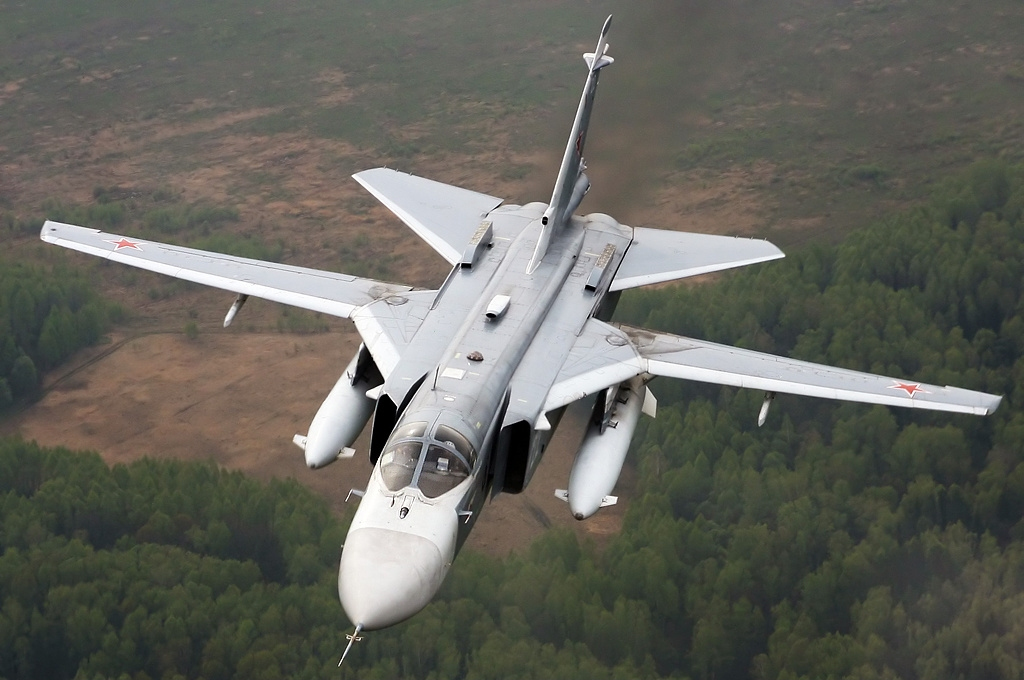
Long range attack aircraft such as the Su-24 became a new threat to air bases during the 1970s and 1980s

Bas 90 (Flygbassystem 90, Air Base System 90) was an air base system used by the Swedish Air Force during the Cold War. Bas 90 was developed during the 1970s and 1980s from the existing Bas 60 system in response to the new threats and needs that had arisen since the conception of the Bas 60 system during the 1950s. Like its predecessor, the Bas 90 system was based around defensive force dispersal of aircraft across many krigsflygbaser (wartime air bases) in case of war, as well as dispersion of the air base functions within the individual bases themselves. The air units would have been dispersed so one squadron (8–12 aircraft) would be stationed per krigsflygbas. The system was a protective measure against nuclear weapons and airstrikes, to make it complicated for an opponent to destroy the Swedish Air Force on the ground and thus ensure endurance for the air force in a conflict scenario.

The Six-Day War, where the Israeli Air Force destroyed most of the Egyptian Air Force on the ground during its opening stages in Operation Focus, served both as validation for the Swedish dispersion concept and as reason to develop the system further. Another reason to improve the system was the introduction of long range attack aircraft (primarily the Su-24) and cluster munitions and anti-runway bombs, which made air bases more vulnerable to conventional bombing. Bas 60 had primarily been designed around the threat of nuclear weapons.

The development of Bas 90 began in the 1970s and started being implemented in the 1980s. The main improvements in Bas 90 compared to Bas 60 was the addition of backup runways in direct vicinity to the main airfield, a more mobile groundcrew and improved communication technology.

The goal was to have a total of about 200 runways of different types available for military use across Sweden. This included bases that would not be upgraded to Bas 90 standard, road runways from the Bas 60 system and selected civilian airports. The air bases became organized into flygbasgrupper (air base groups). One air base group consisted of a main base (built or planned to be built to Bas 90 standard) and a number of alternative and reserve bases.

During peace time the air squadrons were stationed at their respective air wing and deployment to the wartime air bases would only occur when the threat level increased. But many of the air wings also doubled as wartime air bases and thus some air wings were also built to Bas 90 standard. The wartime air bases were only manned by a smaller bastropp (base troop) during peace time and the full base battalion would only be manned with a mobilization (except during certain exercises). This was because the majority of the units were made up by conscripts. The base system was therefore never fully active during the time it existed, like the rest of the Swedish Armed Forces during the Cold War and the immediate period after.

== Base layout ==
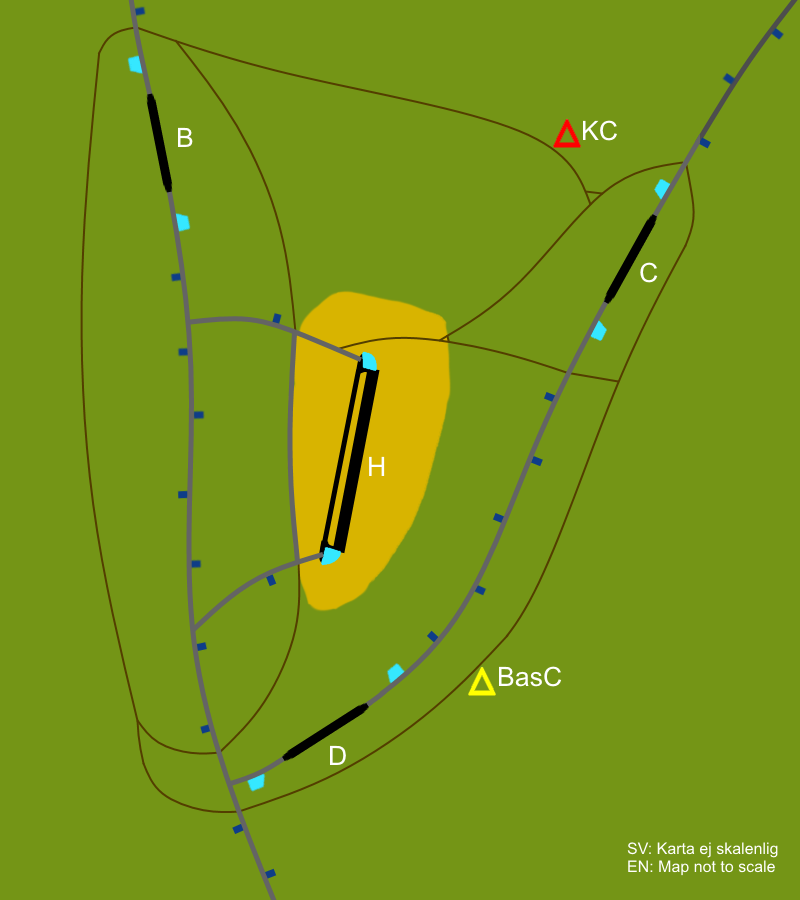
Typical configuration of a Bas 90 base (not to scale) Main runway (H) and short runways (B, C and D) Public road Runway aprons Flight line positions (hardstands) KC, Command Centre BasC, The Base Central

Bas 90 bases were mainly built from existing Bas 60 bases. The new system required expanding base infrastructure and construction of new fortifications. The new layout meant that the effective size of a base became 20–40 square kilometers, including surrounding terrain that needed to be surveilled and defended.

=== Main runway ===
The main runway was the same as in the Bas 60 system and remained unchanged. It was a typical runway at a length of 2,000–2,300 metres (6,600–7,500 ft) and 30–40 metres (98–131 ft) wide, with runway aprons and a taxiway running parallel to it.

The main runway was designated Helge (H) in accordance with the Swedish phonetic alphabet, with Helge standing for Huvudbana (Main runway).

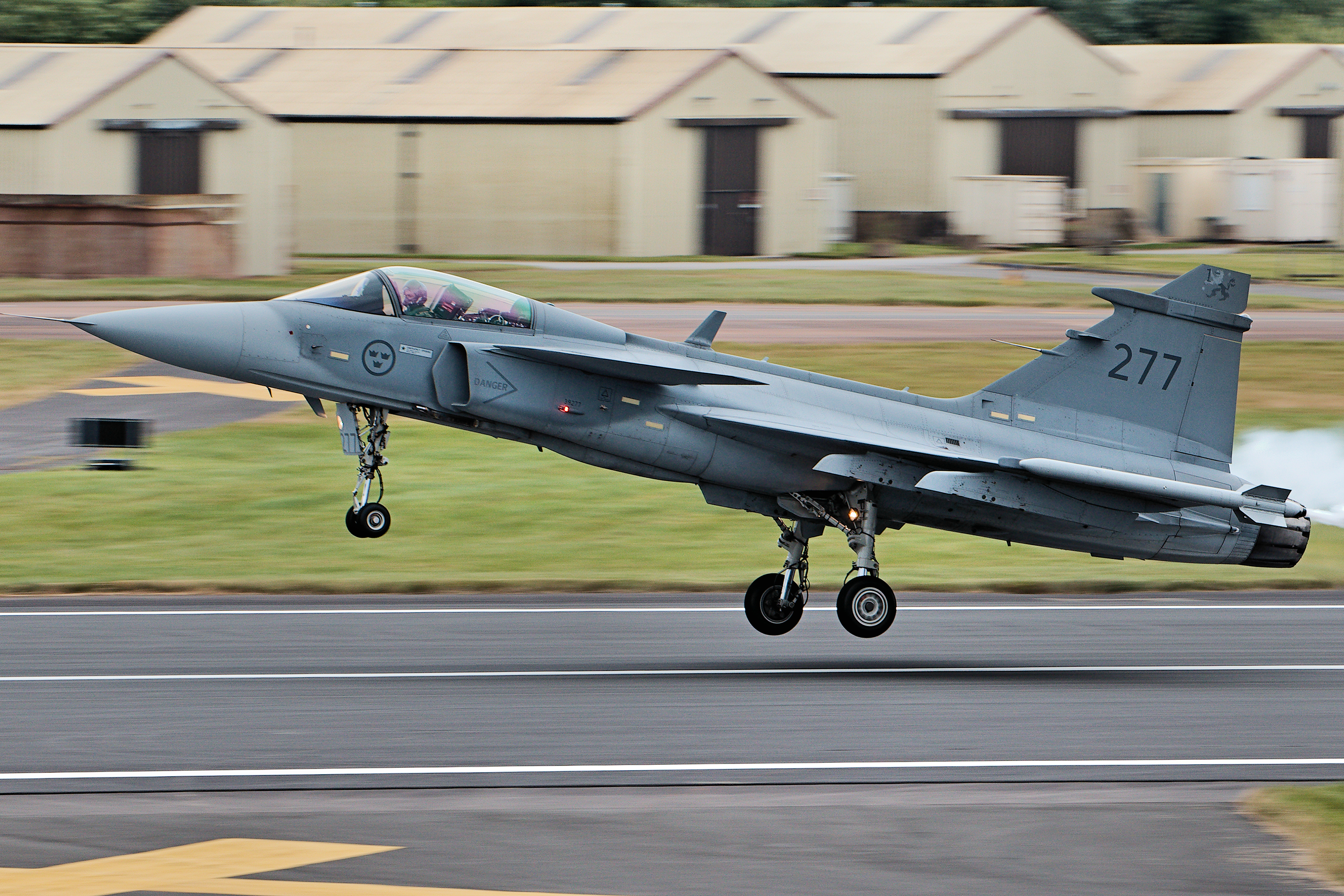
The STOL capability of the Viggen and Gripen reduced the need for full length runways

=== Kortbanor — Short runways ===
To avoid having aircraft become unable to operate from a base after an airstrike on it kortbanor ("short runways" or "short strips") were built as backup runways in the vicinity of the airfield. Typically 2–3 kortbanor were built per base. Similar to the road runways in the Bas 60 system these runways were often built on public roads. A kortbana differed in dimensions from a Bas 60 road runway though; a kortbana was 800 metres (2,600 ft) in length and 17 metres (56 ft) in width, compared to the older road runways which were 1,500–2,000 metres (4,900–6,600 ft) in length and 12 metres (39 ft) in width. Using shorter runways was made possible by the STOL capability of the Viggen (and later the Gripen). Also unlike the Bas 60 road runways the new short runways were built in direct vicinity and directly connected to the main airfield and each other via taxiways, which often also were sections of public road integrated into the base infrastructure. This meant that a Bas 90 base had several kilometers of taxiways in total. Usage of the short runways was limited in adverse light and weather conditions and would primarily be used if the main runway was not available.

The short runways were designated Bertil (B), Cesar (C), David (D), and so on in accordance with the Swedish phonetic alphabet. The designations were assigned from north to south.

=== Flight line positions ===
Compared to Bas 60, the flight line positions in a Bas 90 base were dispersed even further. Individual aircraft spaces (hardstands) were spread out along the taxiways across the entire area of the base, separated by up to 500 metres (1,600 ft). 20–40 individual aircraft hardstands were built on a base, which was more than the number of aircraft that would be stationed there. This was to allow for moving around the flight line operations on a base over time. An aircraft landing on a base would be met by a motorcycle unit that then marshaled the aircraft to its hardstand, where the groundcrew would be waiting. The hardstands could be concealed with camouflage nets and decoy aircraft were used to counter enemy aerial reconnaissance. Aircraft on stand-by at a hardstand would be connected to the bases communication net for the pilot to communicate directly with the base command and air defense central and also receive mission orders.

== Operations ==
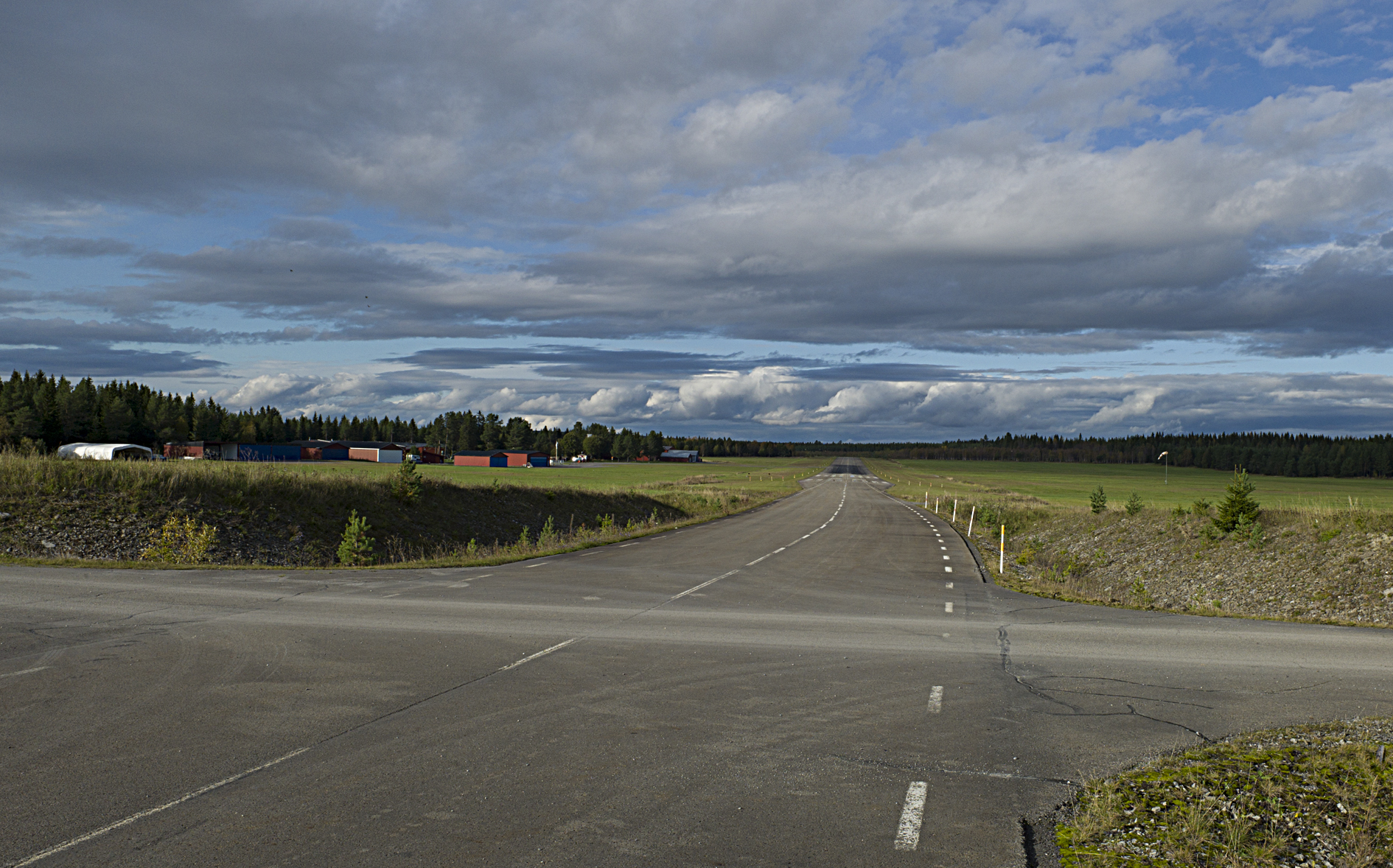
Kortbana (short runway) at former Optand wartime air base – notice the road becoming wider

=== Kommandocentral – Command Centre ===
The Kommandocentral (KC), Command Centre, from Bas 60 was kept, but expanded to be manned by 10 people instead of 6–8. The KC was located in an underground bunker and was the place from where the air traffic operations on the base were led and organized.

=== Bascentralen (BasC) – The Base Central ===
A new addition in Bas 90 was Bascentralen (BasC), The Base Central, where the base command would be stationed. The BasC was located in an underground bunker. Pilots would also be stationed at the BasC in between missions. The BasC was equipped with computers for mission planning and the data could then be transferred to the aircraft computers.

=== TLF – The Traffic Leader at the Field ===
Trafikledaren Vid Fältet (TLF), The Traffic Leader at the Field, assisted in air traffic operations and could take them over completely if necessary. If someone was acting as TLF at one of the short runways they could also take over if required, carrying the necessary radio equipment in a vehicle.

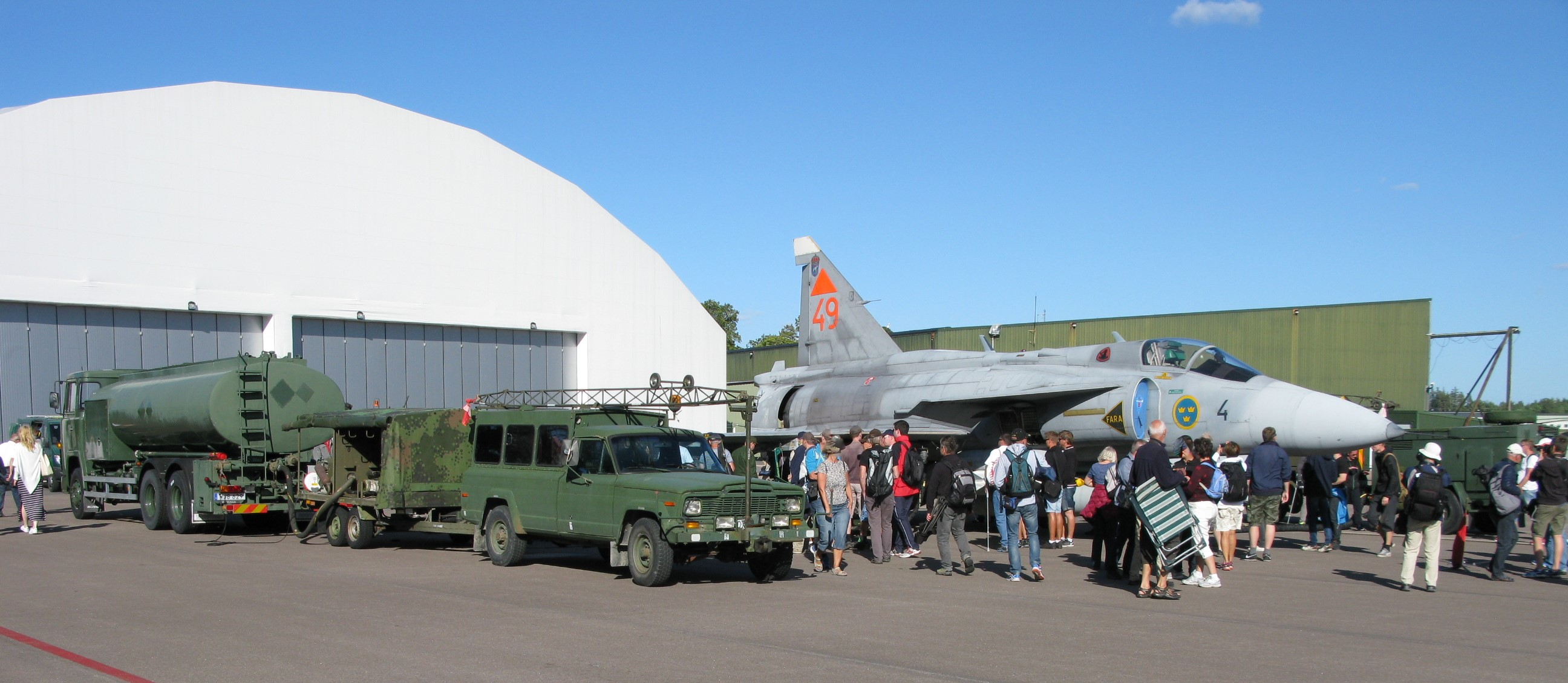
A Viggen aircraft and service vehicles lined up according to the Bas 90 principle of mobile flight line operations, here on public display

== Basbataljon 85 – Base battalion ==
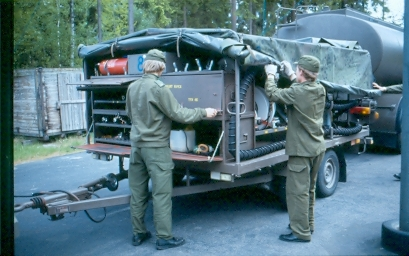
With basbataljon 85, the groundcrew became motorized and would carry all the necessary material and equipment in service vehicles and on trailers

A new type of base battalion was introduced with Bas 90; basbataljon 85 (base battalion type 85).

One of the main improvements with the new battalion type was a more mobile groundcrew that could perform mobile flight line operations. This meant that the groundcrew became motorized to quickly deploy to and between the bases many and spread out flight line positions, carrying the necessary aircraft munition, fuel, tools and other equipment in their vehicles and on trailers. This capability was called rörlig klargöring (mobile turnaround). The groundcrew units would have their staging areas spread out and located away from the base infrastructure as a safety measure, and then deploy from there as ordered. One group of groundcrew (klargöringstropp) consisted of 15 men, with 6 vehicles of different kinds and 4 trailers. A klargöringstropp was dimensioned and equipped to serve one aircraft.

Another addition was the newly formed Swedish Air Force Rangers, which were tasked with searching for and intercepting approaching attackers and infiltrators outside the bases normal defensive perimeters.

About 30 basbataljon 85 were organized during the 1980s. One battalion consisted of the following units:

- Bataljonstab (battalion command): command of the base and the battalion.
- Stabskompani (command company): air traffic control of aircraft on the ground and in the air.
- Stationskompani (station company): aircraft groundcrew and maintenance.
- Markförsvarskompani (ground defense company): base defense and surveillance, consisting of närskyddsplutoner (proximity defense platoons) and Flygbasjägare (Air Force Rangers). The närskyddsplutoner would form the defense around the immediate base area and the Air Force Rangers would patrol further away from the base.
- Skyddskompani (security company): base security, removal of unexploded ordnance and fire fighting.
- Flygfältsarbetskompani (field works company): base infrastructure repair and maintenance.
- Underhållskompani (service company): medical care, food service and logistics.

The defense of the base could also be reinforced with infantry and anti-air units from the Swedish Army.

== 1990s–2010s ==
The Bas 90 project slowed down with the end of the cold war, and was halted by the mid 1990s. The system was completely scrapped in the 2000s and many of the wartime air bases have been demilitarized and sold to civilian owners. About 20 bases had been expanded to Bas 90 standard to varying degrees when the project was halted.

However, with the international developments during the 2010s, particularly in regards to Russia and its war against Ukraine, there was renewed interest expressed in 2017 for reclaiming former air bases and their capabilities.

== List of Bas 90 air bases ==
Initially the Bas 90 project focused on expanding the air bases in northern Sweden, as the air force wanted to increase the base capacity in the region.

Air bases expanded to Bas 90 standard. The project was halted after the fall of the eastern bloc, and thus not completed.
= Fully expanded
= Partially expanded
= Planned, not expanded

Facility number	Airfield	Code 1	Code 2	Year(s) built	No. of short runways	Other
Anl 102	Gunnarn	fält 28	60	1987	3	Used for civilian Airport
Anl 103	Hagshult	C 18	29	1983	3	Still in use.
Anl 105	Moholm	fält 8	36	–	–	Planned, not expanded.
Anl 106	Hallviken	fält 27	–	–	–	Planned, not expanded. Older airfield built during World War II.
Anl 109	Tierp	fält 14	48	–	–	Planned, not expanded.
Anl 113	Heden	fält 32	61	–	–	Planned, not expanded.
Anl 115	Råda	fält 20	37	1990–1991	4 (shared with Såtenäs)	Formed a pair base together with Såtenäs.
Anl 119	Fällfors	fält 40	66	1983	3	The only Bas 90 base with a mountain hangar.
Anl 120	Örebro	–	47	1994	0	Partially expanded, no short runways. Civilian airport.
Anl 126	Hasslösa	fält 6	35	–	–	Planned, not expanded. Would have formed a pair base together with Lidköping.
Anl 130	Uråsa	fält 88	27	–	–	Planned, not expanded.
Anl 131	Lidköping	fält 21	34	–	–	Planned, not expanded. Would have formed a pair base together with Hasslösa.
Anl 136	Rommehed	fält 15	44	1990	2	
Anl 143	Kjula	fält 56	46	1987	2	
Anl 147	Visby	C 25	43	1992	1	
Anl 150	Optand	fält 26	–	1991	2	No main runway, only two short runways.
Anl 160	Vidsel	fält 42	62	1989	3	Today Vidsel Test Range.
Anl 163	Sättna	fält 45	58	–	–	Planned, not expanded.
Anl 166	Kosta	fält 87	31	–	–	Planned, not expanded.
Anl 168	Gällivare	fält 33	–	–	–	Planned, not expanded. Civilian airport.
Anl 170	Kubbe	fält 44	57	1990	3	
Anl 171	Åmsele	fält 41	67	1985	3	
Anl 172	Knislinge	fält 84	25	–	–	Planned, not expanded.
Anl 177	Byholma	fält 85	26	1989	2	
Anl 181	Färila	fält 46	59	1991	3	
Anl 189	Jokkmokk	fält 49	69	1988	3	Still in use.
Anl 192	Mora	–	–	–	–	Planned, not expanded. Civilian airport.
Anl 202	Arvidsjaur	–	–	1989	0	Partially expanded, no short runways.
Anl 211	Karlstad	–	53	1997	0	Partially expanded, no short runways.
Anl 301	Hässlö	F 1	01	1991	1	Partially expanded, one short runway. Civilian airport.
Anl 303	Malmen	F 3	03	1992	1	Partially expanded, one short runway. Today houses the helicopter wing of the Swedish Air Force.
Anl 304	Frösön	F 4	04	1991	1	F 4 Frösön and Civilian airport.
Anl 305	Ljungbyhed	F 5	05	1985	1	F 5 Ljungbyhed. Partially expanded, one short runway.
Anl 306	Karlsborg	F 6	06	–	–	F 6 Karlsborg. Planned, not expanded.
Anl 307	Såtenäs	F 7	07	1990–1991	4 (shared with Råda)	F 7 Såtenäs. Formed a pair base together with Råda.
Anl 313	Bråvalla	F 13	13	1981	0	F 13 Norrköping. Partially expanded, no short runways.
Anl 315	Söderhamn	F 15	15	1978	1	F 15 Söderhamn. Partially expanded, one short runway.
Anl 316	Uppsala	F 16	16	?	0	F 16 Uppsala. Partially expanded, no short runways.
Anl 321	Luleå	F 21	21	1996	1	F 21 Luleå. Partially expanded, one short runway. Civilian airport.
