= Hardened aircraft shelter =

Protective dome for housing aircraft

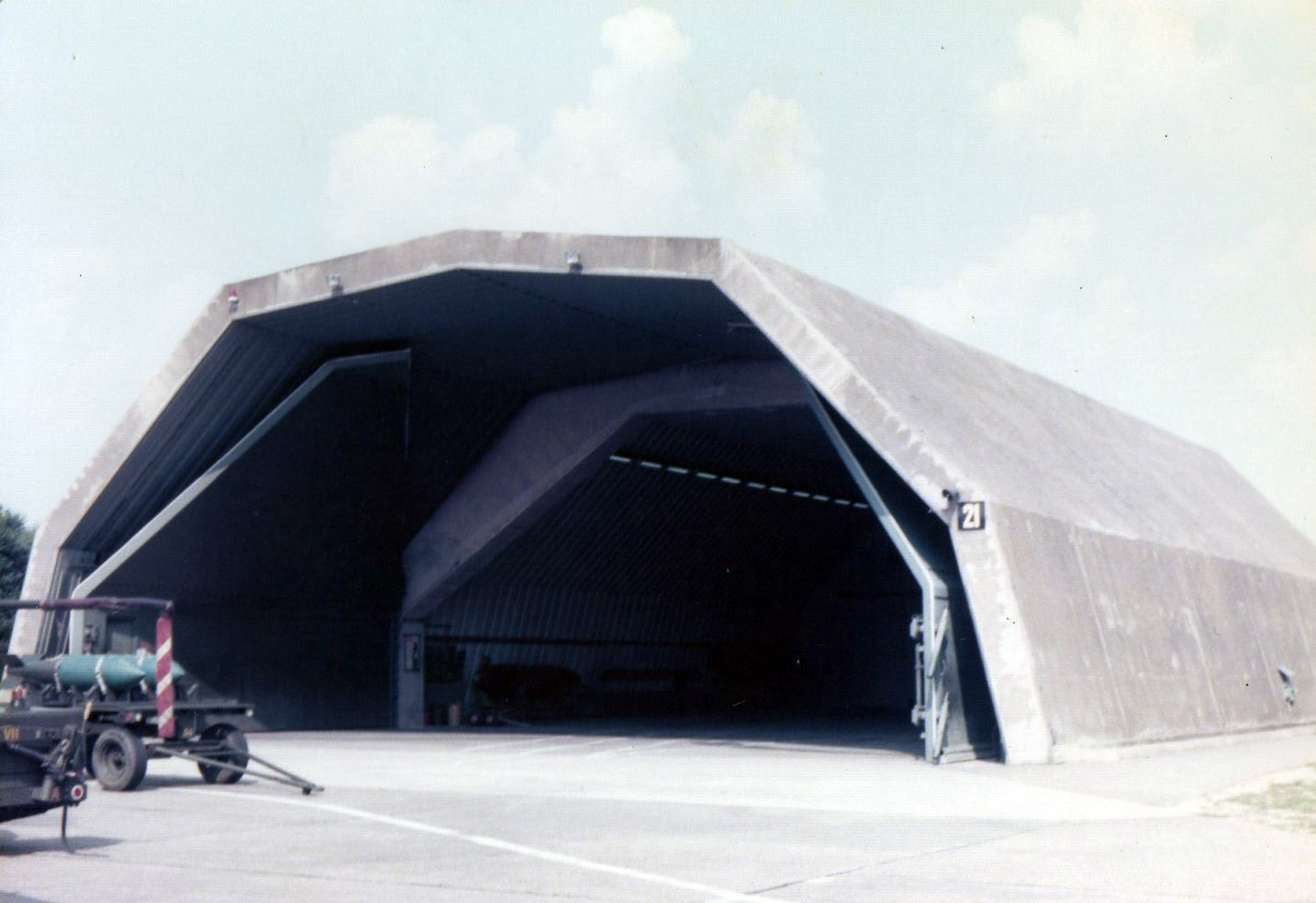
Hardened aircraft shelter at RAF Bruggen, 1981

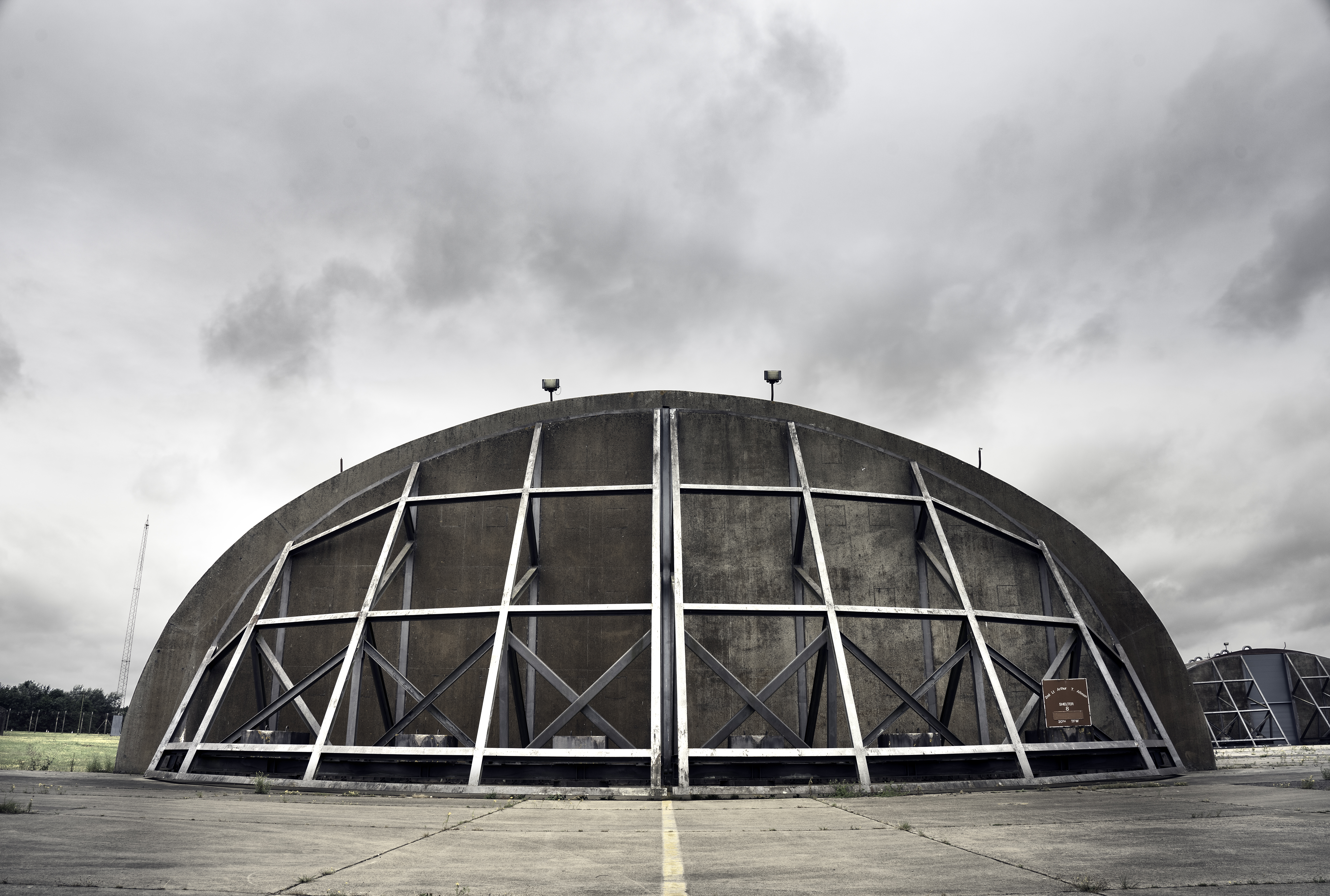
The HASs at RAF Upper Heyford in the United Kingdom are protected as scheduled monuments.

A hardened aircraft shelter (HAS) or protective aircraft shelter (PAS) is a reinforced hangar to house and protect military aircraft from enemy attack. Cost considerations and building practicalities limit their use to fighter size aircraft.

== Background ==
HASs are a passive defence measure (i.e., they limit the effect of an attack as opposed to active defences, such as surface-to-air missiles, which aim to prevent or at least degrade enemy attacks.) The widespread adoption of hardened aircraft shelters can be traced back to lessons learned from Operation Focus in the 1967 Arab–Israeli Six-Day War, when the Israeli Air Force destroyed the unprotected Egyptian Air Force, at the time the largest and most advanced air force in the Arab world, at its airfields’ airbases.

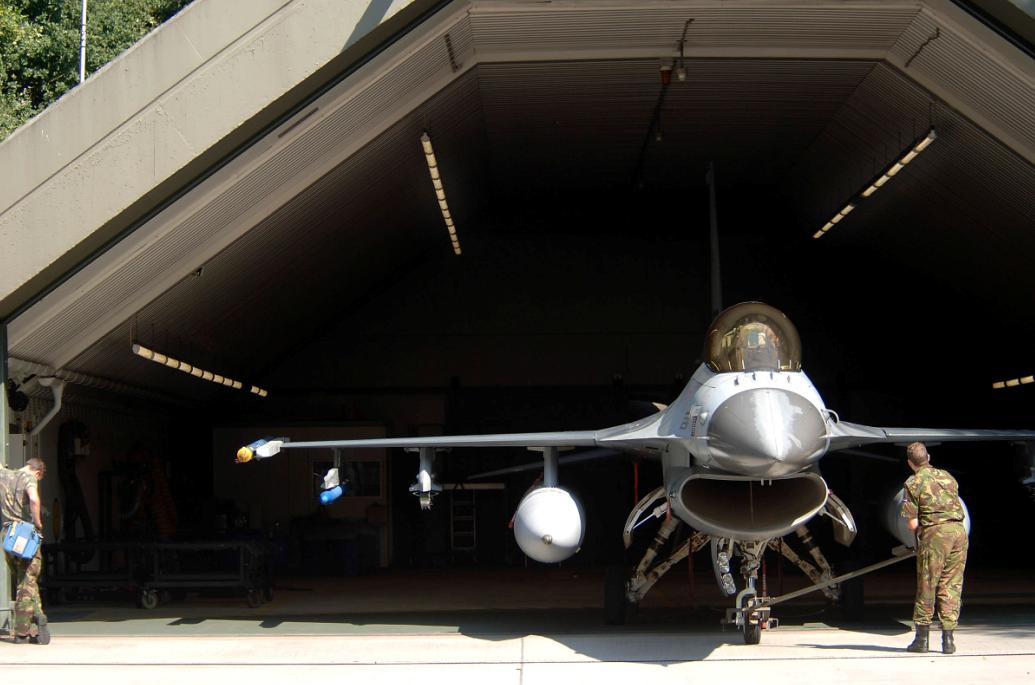
An F-16 being towed into a HAS at Volkel Air Base

As with many military items, whether structures, tanks or aircraft, its most prolific use was during the Cold War. NATO and Warsaw Pact countries built hundreds of HASs across Europe. In this context, hardened aircraft shelters were built to protect aircraft from conventional attacks, as well as nuclear, chemical and biological strikes. NATO shelters, built to standard designs across the continent, were designed to withstand a direct hit by a 500 lb (226 kg) bomb, or a near miss by a larger one (i.e., 1,000 lb+). In theory, HASs were also built to protect aircraft in a nuclear strike; however, the effect of such an attack on airfield taxiways, runways, support facilities and personnel would have made any retaliatory mission extremely difficult, and subsequent return and rearming almost impossible.

In the post-Cold War era, the value of the HAS concept was further eroded by the introduction of precision-guided munitions (PGM). Iraq's HAS hangars were built to a standard somewhat higher than NATO or Warsaw Pact shelters, but nevertheless proved less useful during the Gulf War. Early attempts to defeat Iraqi HASs typically used a "one-two punch" using a TV-guided missile to blast open the doors, followed by bombs tossed in the front. US efforts soon turned to simply dropping a 2,000 lb (910 kg) laser guided bomb on the top of the HAS, which would easily penetrate the roof and explode within. With that being said, however, NATO hangars would still remain useful against the forces of any enemy as might conceivably engage Europe in an armed conflict in the short term (whose capabilities generally lack precision guidance systems needed to defeat the defensive shield such hangars offer).

Hardened hangars became important again with the increasing use of kamikaze drones, which could penetrate air defences and damage aircraft but lack the payload to damage hardened shelters. The Russo-Ukrainian War resulted in Russia expanding hardened shelters due to constant attacks by Ukrainian kamikaze drones and missiles. The US however, did not make significant investments in hardened shelters, considering construction uneconomical despite wargames showing potential risks as well as lessons from Ukraine. The US pusback against expanding HAS became a security vulnerability during the 2026 Iran War when Iran launched ballistic missile barrages and drone swarms towards US air bases.

== Advantages ==
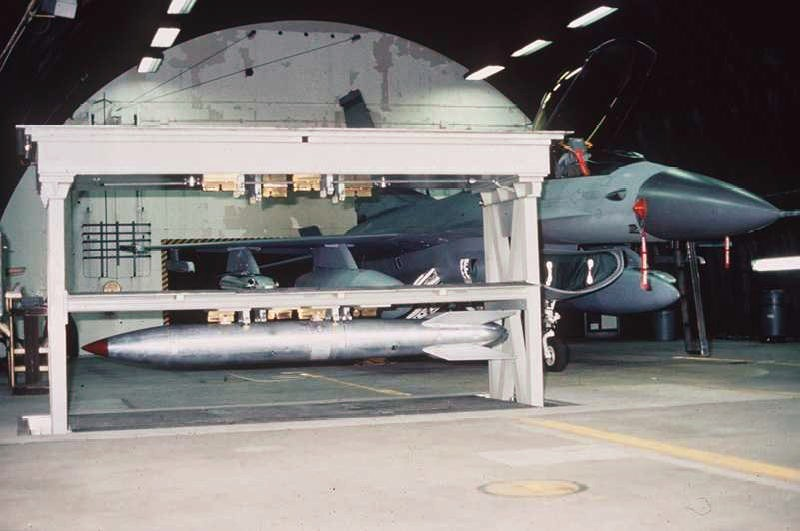
Inside a PAS, showing a Weapons Storage and Security System vault in raised position holding a B61 nuclear bomb

- Reduces vulnerability of aircraft to all but the most accurate precision weaponry
- Provides protection against chemical weapon attack.
- Prevents satellite/aerial reconnaissance seeing whether aircraft are present.
- Permits aircraft maintenance and turn-round in weathertight and relatively safe conditions.
- Combined with active airfield defences, increases survivability of defender's aircraft and cost to enemy's forces in destroying them.
- An alternative option, dispersal of aircraft to many different bases, reduces the efficiency of aircraft at both squadron and air force level.
- Weapons, including nuclear weapons, can be stored in the HAS, sometimes in a vault under the aircraft; e.g., the United States Air Force Weapons Storage and Security System (WS3).
- Protects from small arms such as mortars and small drones
- Protects from submunitions and cluster bombs, some of which, such as those from ballistic missiles, could be released at an altitude higher than some air defences could intercept.

== Disadvantages ==
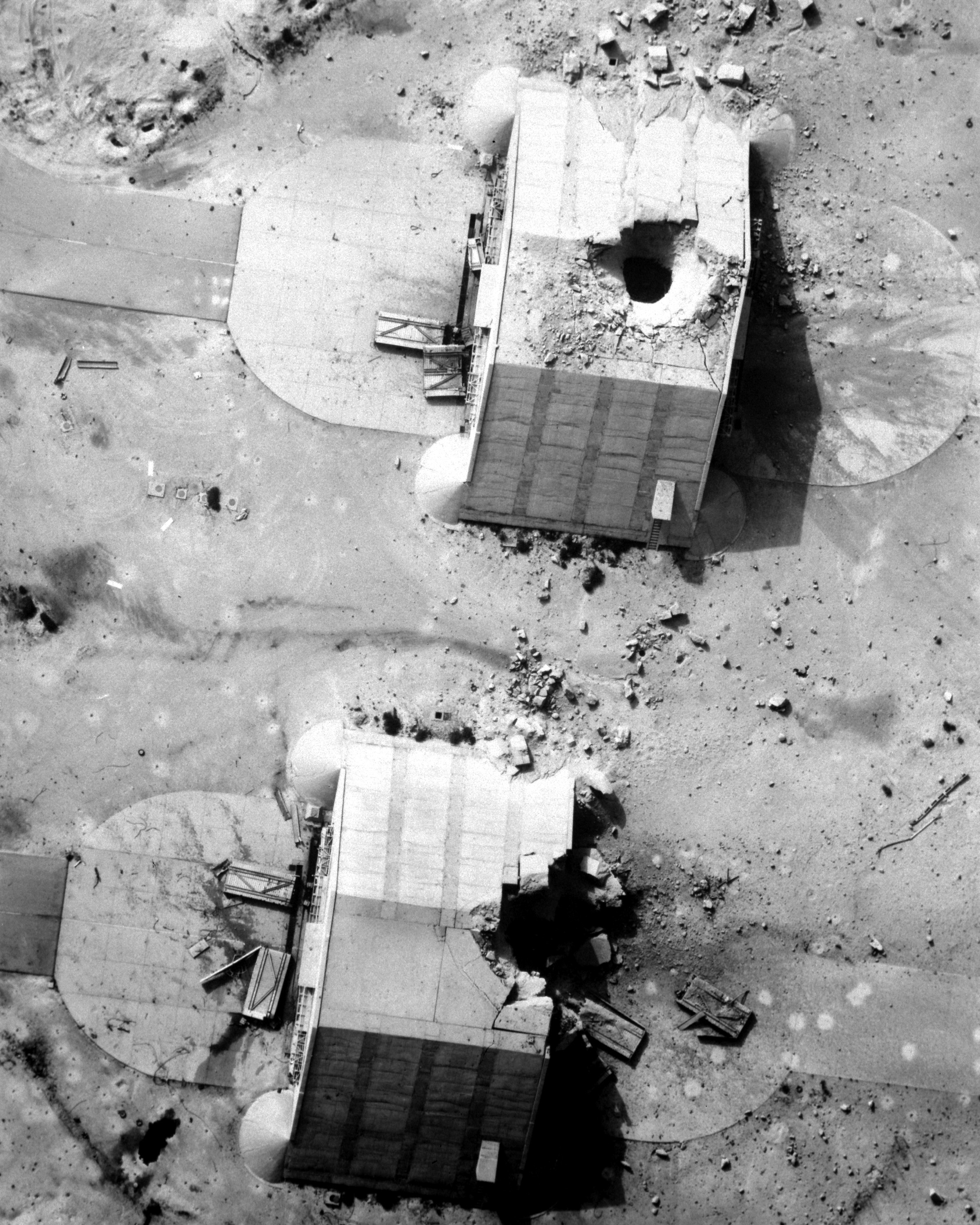
Two reinforced hangars that were penetrated by Coalition bombing during Operation Desert Storm, 1991. These Kuwaiti shelters were built by the French and used by Iraqi forces during the conflict. Picture is of Ahmad al-Jaber Air Base - Kuwait.

- They are in a fixed known position.
- Hardened shelters are expensive. In 1999, a hardened shelter for a single aircraft would have cost the USAF $4 million, and this would not have included the cost of building hardened shelters for aircraft spare parts and other equipment, command and control etc.
- Hardened aircraft shelters do not protect air force personnel. In the Gulf war, the number of personnel required for air operations reached the thousands. They were housed in tents in the desert, which were vulnerable to missile attacks.
- Hardened shelters are usually too small to accommodate large aircraft such as strategic transport aircraft and large surveillance aircraft, most of them are used for fighter aircraft and aircraft with a similar or smaller size.
- Time taken for construction requires forward planning regarding most likely combat zones. If a conflict flares up quickly aircraft may be afforded no protection; e.g., in both the Gulf War and 2003 Iraq War many coalition aircraft had only sun shelters, not hardened facilities.
- When first developed, the likelihood of a direct hit was minimal. Today, with precision-guided munitions (PGMs) and adequate training, delivering a direct hit on a HAS is trivial. Coalition aircraft destroyed over half of Iraq's HASs during the Gulf War.

== Alternatives ==
=== Deployable shelters ===
Kevlar-lined deployable shelters could protect aircraft from bomblets (a common anti-airfield weapon). However, this would provide no protection from PGMs.

=== Dispersal at bases ===
Wider dispersal (distance between aircraft) at airbases would decrease the vulnerability of aircraft. This would also force an enemy to increase the number of attacking aircraft greatly, or spend more time over the target. Either way, the effect of airfield defences would take a heavy toll on the aggressor. However, like HAS, dispersal can be expensive, requiring massive construction of hardstanding. Defence against enemy special forces is also more difficult.

=== Dispersal between bases ===
Dispersing aircraft between many bases (such as satellite landing aerodromes) greatly increases the cost of attacking a given number of aircraft, as measured by the number of attack aircraft required. However, this option similarly increases the defenders' cost of operation and degrades their efficiency.

=== Dispersal to road runways ===
Dispersal of aircraft to road runways will present the attacker with a multitude of targets which cannot be simultaneously attacked. Survivability is enhanced if the defender also chooses to use mobile tactics, using each highway strip for a limited number of sorties before moving on to another. With penny packets of two to four aircraft at each location, such a tactic increases the difficulty of effective co-ordination, and command and control, it also increases vulnerability to attack from the ground. However, with adequate planning these are not insurmountable problems.

=== Underground hangars ===
Several air forces have used tunnels dug into a mountainside as underground hangars.

=== Sweden: Bas 60 and Bas 90 ===
Sweden developed its own alternative during the Cold War. In the late 1950s, the Swedish Air Force introduced the Bas 60 airbase system, which revolved around both the principle of dispersal between bases and dispersal at bases simultaneously. Road runways (highway strips) were also introduced as alternative bases. Bas 60 was primarily a response to the nuclear threat, so in the aftermath of the Six-Day War in 1967, and the introduction of long range attack aircraft, such as the Sukhoi Su-24, the system was further developed into Bas 90. Improvements in the Bas 90 system included construction of short backup runways in the direct vicinity of the airbases, and further dispersion of aircraft positioning and ground operations. The Swedish Air Force Rangers were also raised specifically to counter the threat of infiltrating enemy special forces.

== See also ==
- Index of aviation articles
- Christmas tree
- Revetment (aircraft)

== Sources ==
- Vick, Alan J. (1999). Air Base Attacks and Defensive Counters: Historical Lessons and Future Challenges. RAND Corporation.
