= Bas 60 =

Swedish air base system during the Cold War

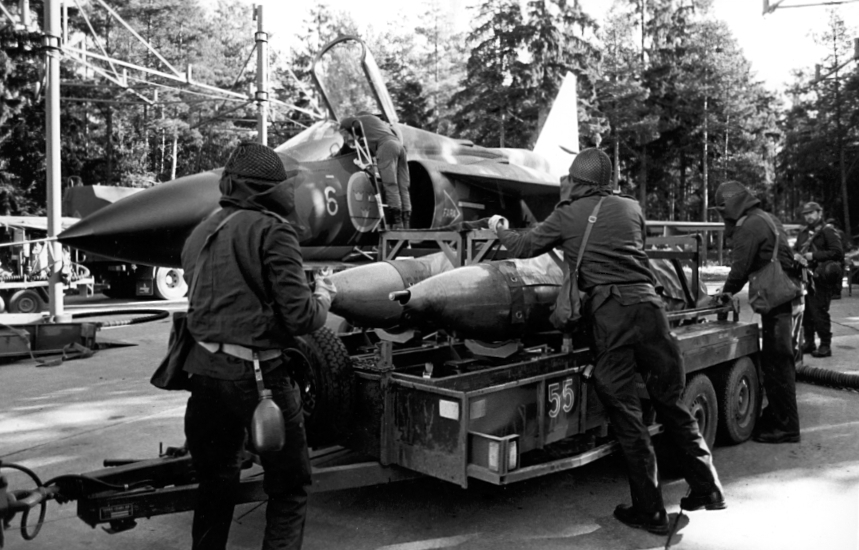
An AJ 37 Viggen being serviced in bakom (rear flight line position) at a wartime air base in Sweden

Bas 60 (Flygbassystem 60, Air Base System 60) was an air base system developed and used by the Swedish Air Force during the Cold War. The system was based around defensive force dispersal of aircraft and its supporting ground operations across many krigsflygbaser (wartime air bases) in case of war, primarily as a protective measure against nuclear weapons. The purpose of the system was to make it complicated for an opponent to destroy the Swedish Air Force on the ground and thus ensure endurance for the air force in a conflict scenario. The plan was to disperse the air units so one krigsflygbas would house one squadron (8-12 aircraft). This dispersion principle also applied to the individual wartime bases themselves, meaning that the various functions of an air base were spread over a large area in and around the base.

The system originated from an air force inquiry in 1954 and was formally implemented in the 1958 defence plan. The original plan called for 70 wartime air bases to be built, with 46 of them to be equipped for continuous usage. The number of bases was however reduced with every revision of the plan and about 40 bases ended up being completed.

During peace time the air squadrons were stationed at their respective air wing and deployment to the wartime air bases would only occur when the threat level increased. But many of the air wings also doubled as wartime air bases. The wartime air bases were only manned by a smaller bastropp (base troop) during peace time and the full base battalion would only be manned with a mobilization (except during certain exercises). This was because the majority of the units were made up by conscripts. The base system was therefore never fully active during the time it existed, like the rest of the Swedish Armed Forces during the Cold War.

A wartime air base in the Bas 60 system functioned as ordinarie bas (regular base), shortened as "O-bas" (R-base), for one or more type of aircraft; fighter, attack or reconnaissance. A regular base had the personnel and resources needed for maintaining and repairing the type of aircraft assigned to that base. Some bases also doubled as temporär bas (temporary base), shortened as "T-bas" (T-base), for one or more aircraft types. A temporary base only had capacity to refuel and rearm the type of aircraft it acted as temporary base for. All regular bases acted as temporary bases for fighter aircraft.

Road runways were also built to complement the wartime bases, acting as a backup bases. Civilian airports could also be used as a backup alternative.

The system was further developed into Bas 90 during the 1970s and 1980s.

== Base layout ==
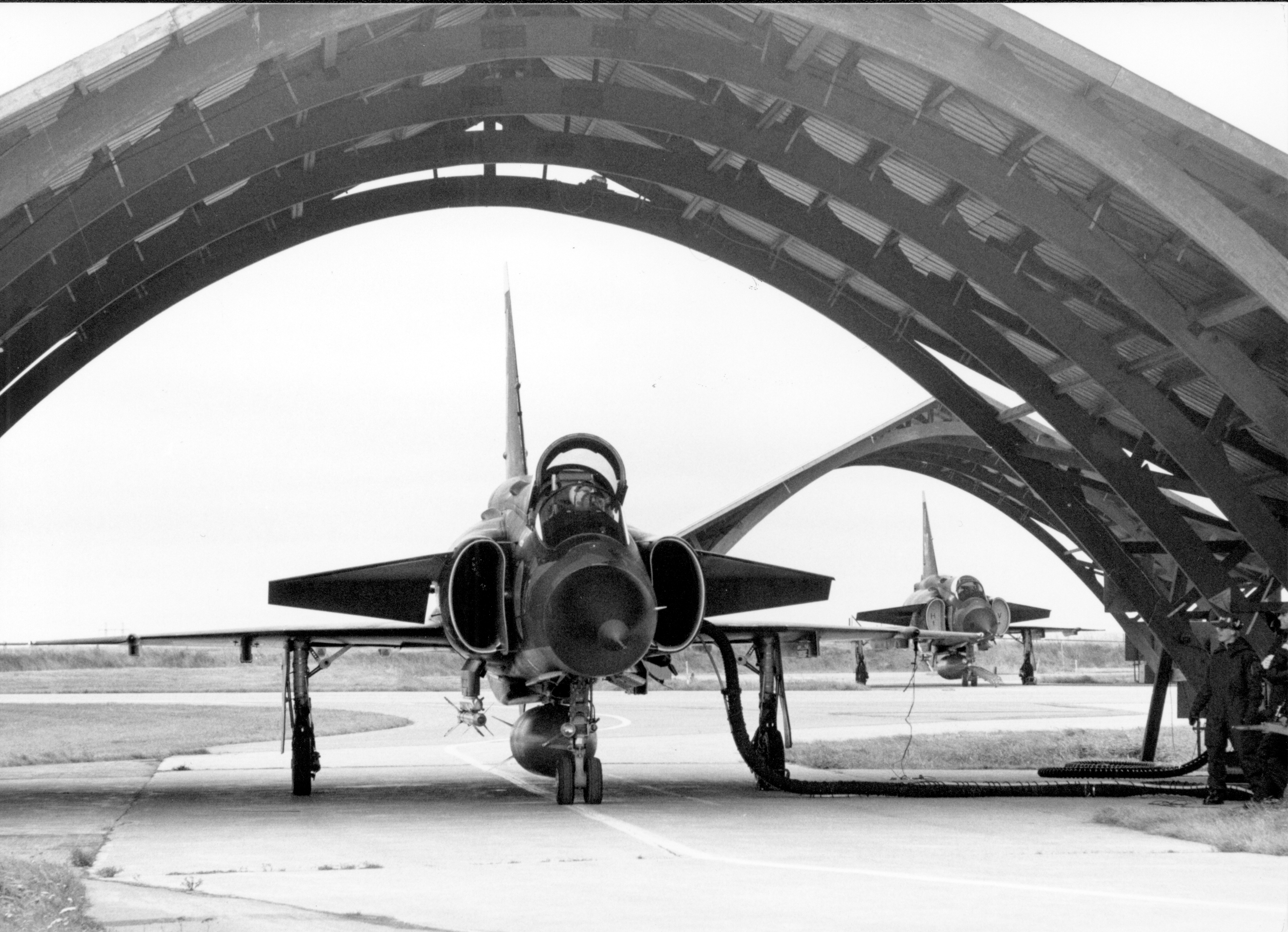
Two JA 37 Viggen on stand-by at framom (fore flight line position) at a wartime air base

=== Main runway ===
The main runway was a typical runway at a length of 2,000–2,300 metres (6,600–7,500 ft) and 30–40 metres (98–131 ft) wide, with a taxiway running parallel to it. Visual aids for pilots such as runway lights were installed. At the ends of the runway there were raisable and lowerable nets for capturing aircraft that were not able to take off or land properly.

=== Framom - Fore flight line position ===
Främre klargöringsområde (framom), fore flight line position, was the flight line position (apron) by the main runway, and was where fighter aircraft were to be prepared for missions and be on standby. A base usually had two framom positions, one located at each end of the main runway. One framom position had space for four aircraft. Attack and reconnaissance aircraft in need of complementary refueling could also be refueled at framom. Fighter aircraft on standby at framom were directly connected to the bases communication net so the pilots could receive orders directly and take off immediately after receiving the order. When no aircraft were at framom, the groundcrew would evacuate the area as a safety measure and return when new aircraft came in.

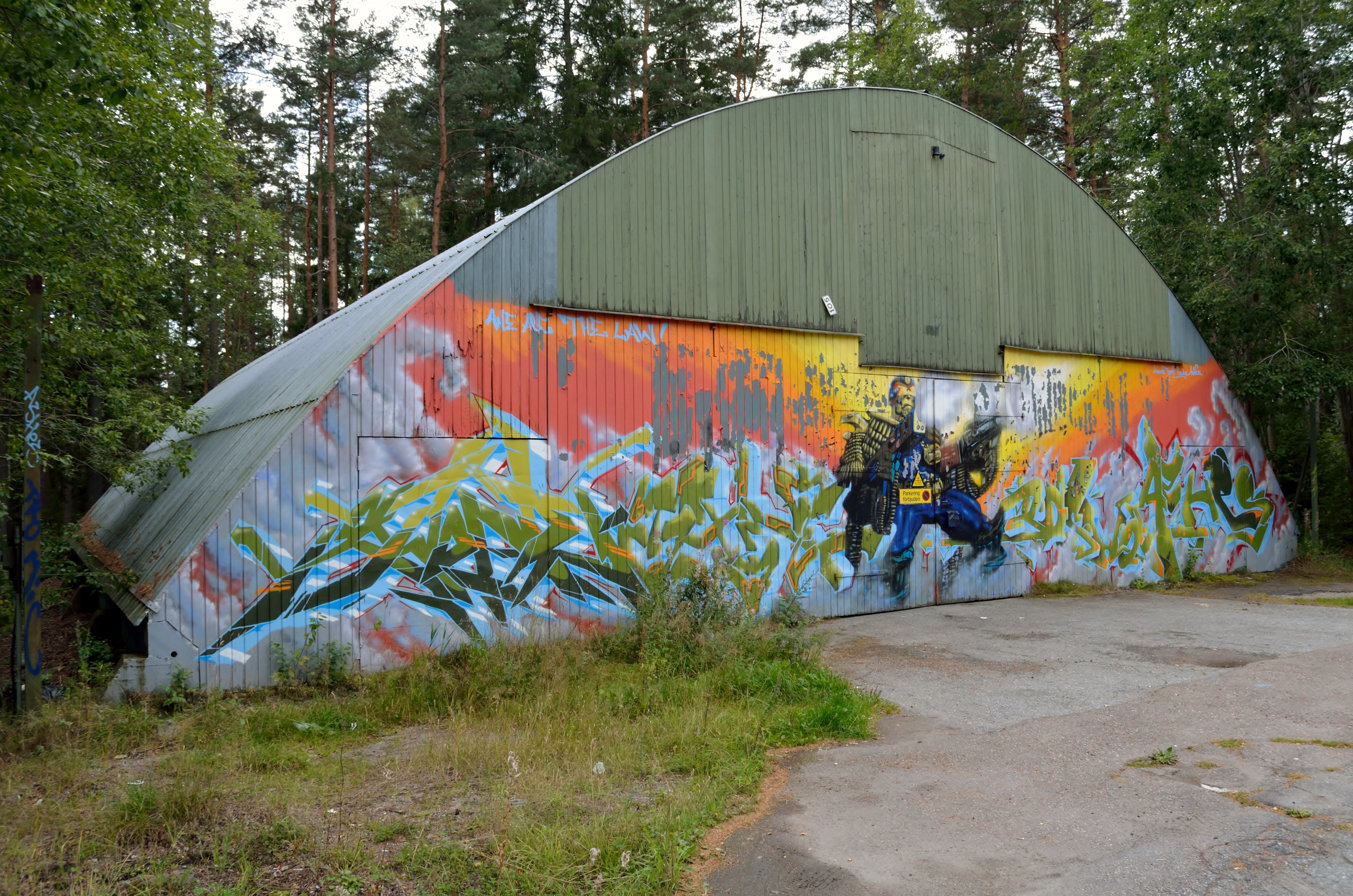
Field hangar at the uom site for former air base Hässlö

=== Bakom - Rear flight line position ===
Bakre klargöringsområde (bakom), rear flight line position, was the flight line position for attack and reconnaissance aircraft. Bakom was located 2–3 kilometres (1.2–1.9 mi) away from the main airfield and only bases that were regular bases for attack and reconnaissance aircraft had a bakom position. In case a base was a regular base for both attack and reconnaissance there were two separate bakom positions, referred to as bakom-attack (rear-attack) and bakom-spaning (rear-reconnaissance). A bakom position had 10-15 individual aircraft spaces (hardstands) with a distance of 50 metres (160 ft) between each space, and aircraft currently in bakom were to be separated as much as possible within the available aircraft spaces. This was to reduce the risk of having all aircraft destroyed in a single attack. The aircraft spaces could also be concealed with camouflage nets. Bakom was connected to the main airfield via a taxiway that in many cases was public road integrated into the base infrastructure, and aircraft could either taxi on their own between the sections of the base or be towed by a vehicle.

=== Uom - Staging area ===
Uppställningsområdet (uom), staging area, was where aircraft undergoing long-term maintenance, such as repairs, or not being in immediate use were kept. Uom was located 5–10 kilometres (3.1–6.2 mi) away from the main airfield. A uom had field hangars for maintenance work and a site for engine swapping and testing. Just like at bakom the aircraft spaces at uom could be concealed with camouflage nets and was connected with the rest of the base via a taxiway that often was public road. Most of the aircraft groundcrew and their equipment would be positioned at uom.

== Road runways and reserve bases ==
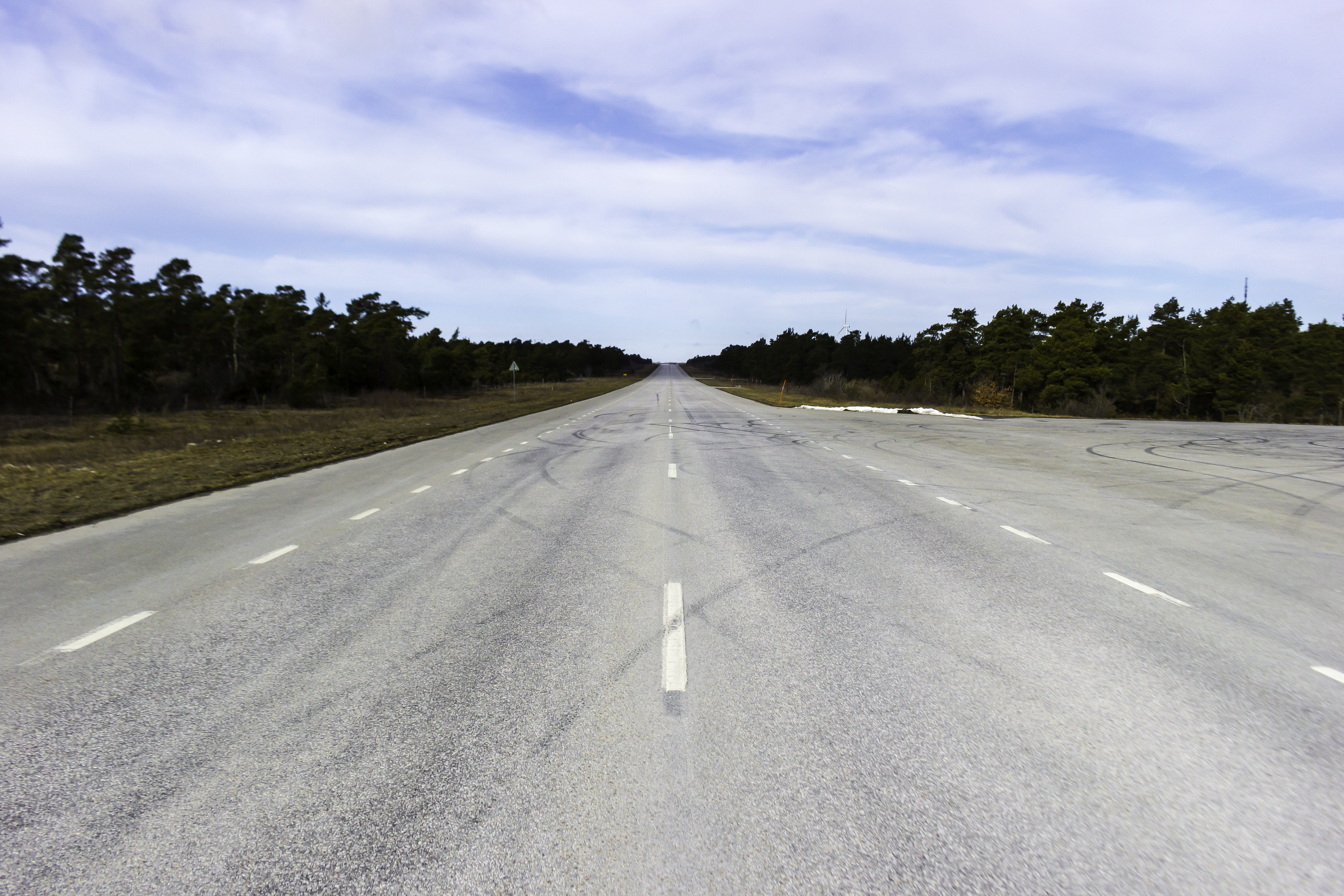
A Bas 60 road runway with a small runway apron visible on the right

To complement the ordinary Bas 60 bases, reservvägbaser (road runways) were built to act as a backup alternative. Selected sections of public roads that were suitable for the purpose were widened to give enough space for aircraft to take-off and land. The typical dimensions for a reservvägbas (road runway) was 1,500–2,000 metres (4,900–6,600 ft) in length and 12 metres (39 ft) in width. One or two runway aprons were built near each end of the runway. About 30 road runways were built, primarily in the southern and eastern parts of Sweden. Usage of the road runways were limited by adverse light and weather conditions, which is why they were primarily considered a backup alternative. Utilizing a road runway required relocating units and resources from an ordinary base, and certain field works around the runway were often necessary before it could be used.

Selected civilian airports were later added as additional reserve bases.

== Operations ==
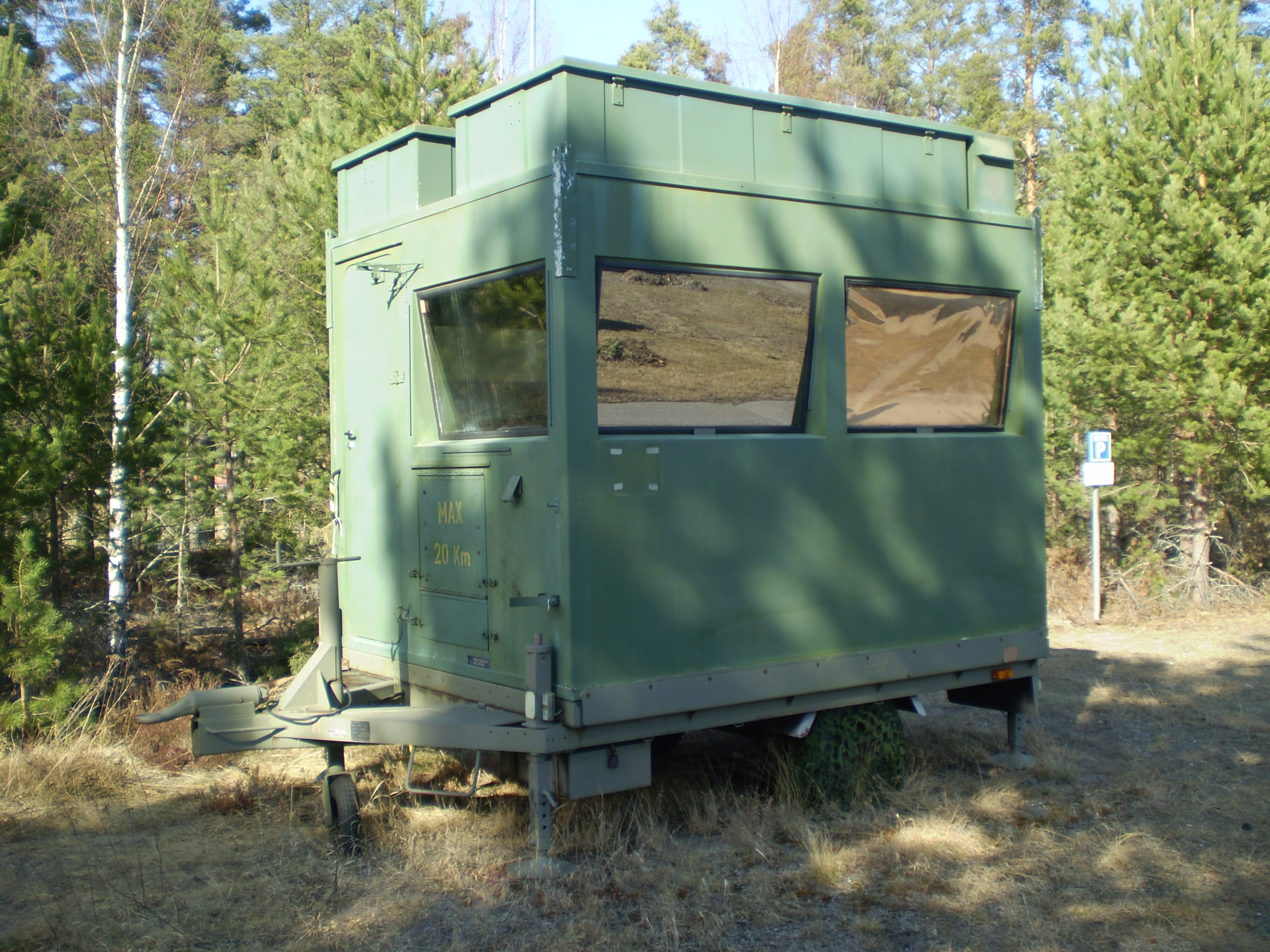
TLF-cart

=== Kommandocentral - Command centre ===
The air traffic operations on a base were led and organized from a kommandocentral (command centre), abbreviated as KC, located in an underground bunker a few kilometers away from the airfield. A KC was manned by 6-8 people, including the duty officer.

=== TLF - The traffic leader at the field ===
Trafikledaren vid fältet (TLF), the traffic leader at the field, was stationed at the main runway and assisted the air traffic operations. In case kommandocentralen was unavailable or stopped functioning the TLF could take over control of air traffic operations. The TLF operated from a special cart that was equipped with base radio, air traffic radio, telephone and controls for runway functions such as lighting.

=== Stabsplats - Command post ===
The overarching and long term operations on base were led and organized from a stabsplats (command post). This command post would be located in one or more buildings (often a school) in a nearby town or city. The stabsplats also acted as the camp for many of the base units, including the medical, meteorology and security units.

== Basbataljon 60 - Base battalion ==
One base was operated by a basbataljon 60 (base battalion type 60), with the battalion chief in charge of the overall operations on the base. A fully mobilized battalion consisted of 1200-1500 men, but in peace time a base was normally operated by 2-3 technical officers and 10-15 conscripted flight mechanics. During larger exercises all or part of the full base battalion would be called in.

One base battalion consisted of the following units:

- Stabskompani (command company): command and administration of the base.
- Stationskompani (station company): aircraft groundcrew and maintenance.
- Intendenturkompani (commissariat company): supply and logistics.
- Flygfältsarbetskompani (field works company): base infrastructure repair and maintenance.
- Skyddskompani (security company): base security, removal of unexploded ordnance and fire fighting.
- Sjukvårdspluton (medical platoon): first aid and medical care.

The defense of the base could also be reinforced with infantry and anti-air units from the Swedish Army.

== Further development ==
In the 1970s and 1980s the Bas 60 system was developed into Bas 90 to accommodate new needs and threats.

== Today ==
With the end of the cold war the Bas 60 and Bas 90 system was scrapped, and many of the wartime air bases have been demilitarized and sold to civilian owners.

== List of Bas 60 air bases ==
Air bases in the Bas 60 system (excluding civilian airports in reserve).
= Bas 60
= Not Bas 60, but actively used by the air force during the time period

Facility number	Airfield	Code 1	Code 2	Year(s) built	Other
Anl 101	Skellefteå	–	–	?	Civilian airport
Anl 102	Gunnarn	fält 28	60	1968	Built to Bas 90 in 1987.
Anl 103	Hagshult	C 18	29	1961	Built to Bas 90 in 1983. Still in use.
Anl 105	Moholm	fält 8	36	?	
Anl 107	Everöd	fält 4	20	?	
Anl 109	Tierp	fält 14	48	1965	
Anl 111	Örnsköldsvik	–	–	?	Civilian airport
Anl 113	Heden	fält 32	61	1956, 1959	
Anl 115	Råda	fält 20	37	1971	Built to Bas 90 in 1990-91.
Anl 118	Hultsfred	fält 37	28	1969	
Anl 119	Fällfors	fält 40	66	1958, 1961	Built to Bas 90 in 1983.
Anl 121	Sjöbo	fält 1	23	1960, 1968	
Anl 126	Hasslösa	fält 6	35	1958	
Anl 128	SAAB	–	–	1964, 1967	
Anl 130	Uråsa	fält 88	27	1964	
Anl 131	Lidköping	fält 21	34	1958	
Anl 136	Rommehed	fält 15	44	1960	Built to Bas 90 in 1990.
Anl 138	Eneryda	fält 89	30	1969	Main runway on public road.
Anl 142	Kungsängen	C 4	41	1963, 1966	Civilian airport
Anl 143	Kjula	fält 56	46	1962	Built to Bas 90 in 1987.
Anl 147	Visby	C 25	43	1968	Built to Bas 90 in 1992.
Anl 157	Kiruna	–	–	1971	Civilian airport
Anl 160	Vidsel	fält 42	62	1965	Built to Bas 90 in 1989. Today Vidsel Test Range.
Anl 161	Tågra	fält 81	–	1965	Main runway on public road.
Anl 163	Sättna	fält 45	58	1963	
Anl 166	Kosta	fält 87	31	1963	
Anl 170	Kubbe	fält 44	57	?	Built to Bas 90 in 1990.
Anl 171	Åmsele	fält 41	67	1960	Built to Bas 90 in 1985.
Anl 172	Knislinge	fält 84	25	1963	
Anl 173	Gimo	fält 54	49	1960	
Anl 175	Strängnäs	fält 57	50	1963	
Anl 176	Björkvik	fält 58	42	1967-68	
Anl 177	Byholma	fält 85	26	1961	Built to Bas 90 in 1989.
Anl 178	Ålem	fält 83	–	1968	Main runway on public road.
Anl 181	Färila	fält 46	59	1967	Built to Bas 90 in 1991.
Anl 185	Piteå	fält 48	68	1970	
Anl 186	Sturup	–	–	1972	Civilian airport
Anl 189	Jokkmokk	fält 49	69	1970-71	Built to Bas 90 in 1988. Still in use.
Anl 301	Hässlö	F 1	01	1976	F 1 Hässlö. Partially built to Bas 90 in 1991.
Anl 303	Malmen	F 3	03	1966	F 3 Malmslätt. Partially built to Bas 90 in 1992.
Anl 304	Frösön	F 4	04	1962	F 4 Frösön. Built to Bas 90 in 1991.
Anl 305	Ljungbyhed	F 5	05	?	F 5 Ljungbyhed. Partially built to Bas 90 in 1985.
Anl 306	Karlsborg	F 6	06	?	F 6 Karlsborg
Anl 307	Såtenäs	F 7	07	?	F 7 Såtenäs. Built to Bas 90 in 1990-91.
Anl 308	Barkarby	F 8	08	?	F 8 Barkarby
Anl 310	Ängelholm	F 10	10	1970	F 10 Ängelholm
Anl 311	Nyköping	F 11	11	1969	F 11 Nyköping
Anl 312	Kalmar	F 12	12	1970	F 12 Kalmar
Anl 313	Bråvalla	F 13	13	1977	F 13 Norrköping. Partially built to Bas 90 in 1981.
Anl 315	Söderhamn	F 15	15	1975	F 15 Söderhamn. Partially built to Bas 90 in 1978.
Anl 316	Uppsala	F 16	16	1970	F 16 Uppsala. Partially built to Bas 90.
Anl 317	Ronneby	F 17	17	1961	F 17 Kallinge.

== List of Bas 60 road runways ==
Road runways in the Bas 60 system. Not to be confused with the short runways in the Bas 90 system, which in many cases also were built on public road.

The Bas 60 road runways are not to be confused with the short runways in the Bas 90 system, which in many cases also were built on public road. The Bas 90 short runways belonged to a larger air base and were therefore not counted as individual bases, unlike the Bas 60 road runways.

Airfield	Designation	Year(s) built	Other
Revinge	S17	1967	
Jämjö	S71	1965-66	
Hallabro	–	1966	
Hovmantorp	S46	1966	
Tokebo	S11	1966	Used for training
Målerås	–	–	
Lammhult	–	1966	
Falkenberg	S21	1964-65	
Follingbo	–	1970	
Bro	B0	1964	
Hjo	–	1967	
Klockrike	–	1964	
Tillinge	B32	1965	
Heby	–	1964-65	Used for training
Åland	S97	1964-65	
Björklinge	–	1966	
Gimo	S95	1964	
Gysinge	S41	1964	
Skärplinge	–	1966	
Älvkarleby	S81	1966	
Mokorset	R8	1964-65	
Norrala	–	1965	
Jämtkrogen	–	1968	
Överhörnäs	R19	1964	
Bjurholm	–	1966	
Finnträsk	S65	1965	
Långträsk	–	1966	Used for training
Vidsel	R91	1967	
Jokkmokk	–	–	
