= Swedish Air Force Rangers =

- Flygbasjägarna
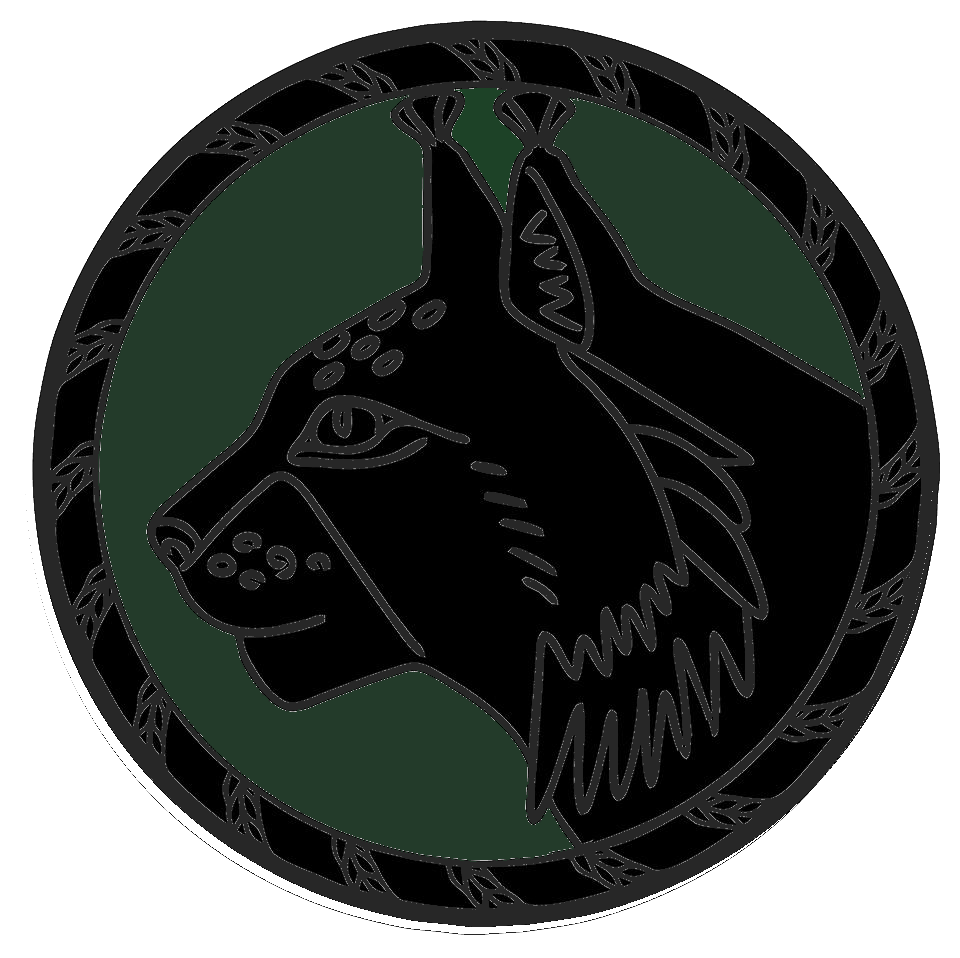
- Air Force Ranger unit insignia
- Active: 1983–present
- Country: Sweden
- Allegiance: Swedish Armed Forces
- Branch: Swedish Air Force
- Type: Air force ground forces and special forces
- Role: Primary roles: Personnel recovery; Reconnaissance; Force protection; Forward air control
- Size: One company
- Part of: Blekinge Wing
- Garrison/HQ: Kallinge, Ronneby Municipality
- Engagements: KFOR; 2011 military intervention in Libya; War in Afghanistan (2001–2021); Northern Mali conflict

Insignia
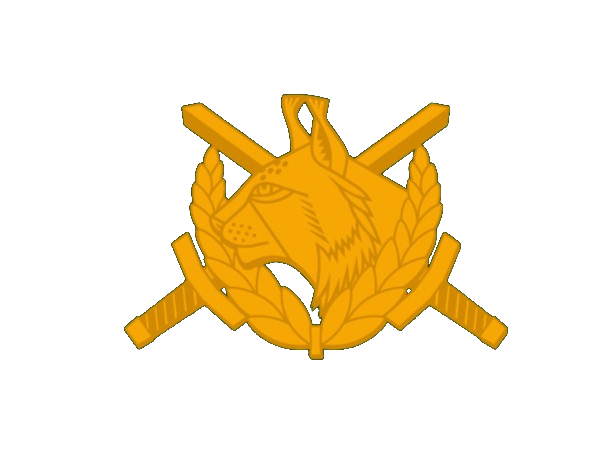
- Training badge

The Swedish Air Force Rangers (Swedish: Flygbasjägarna, FBJ), is an elite specialist ground unit of the Swedish Air Force. The name "Flygbasjägare" originates in the unit's old role during the Cold War of conducting security operations around airfields and other air force installations of Sweden. The current primary tasks of the unit are personnel recovery, reconnaissance and force protection.

== History ==
The Swedish Air Force Rangers were created in the early 1980s with the adoption by the Swedish Air Force of the Bas 90 system of force dispersal of aircraft to wartime air bases (including usage of highway strips) in the event of war. Such dispersed air base operations, both within and between bases, will be most vulnerable to ground attack, especially by enemy special operations forces, and the Air Force Rangers were therefore raised to patrol outside their air bases and to be able to locate and engage enemy special forces.

Service in the Air Force Rangers is both mentally and physically demanding. Training was conducted by the Air Force Ranger School (Flygbasjägarskolan, FbjS) which was until 2004 part of the Skaraborg Wing. The school then moved to the Blekinge Wing (F 17) in Ronneby.

After the Swedish transition from a fully conscripted to a professional military, the 17th Air Force Ranger Company still belongs to the Blekinge Wing and is made up of two platoons and a staff group. The unit consists of primarily full-time enlisted personnel.

Since 1 January 2001, all Air Force Ranger platoons of the Swedish Armed Forces are organized in the 25th Air Force Ranger Company (25:e flygbasjägarkompaniet) at the Blekinge Wing.

== Tasks ==
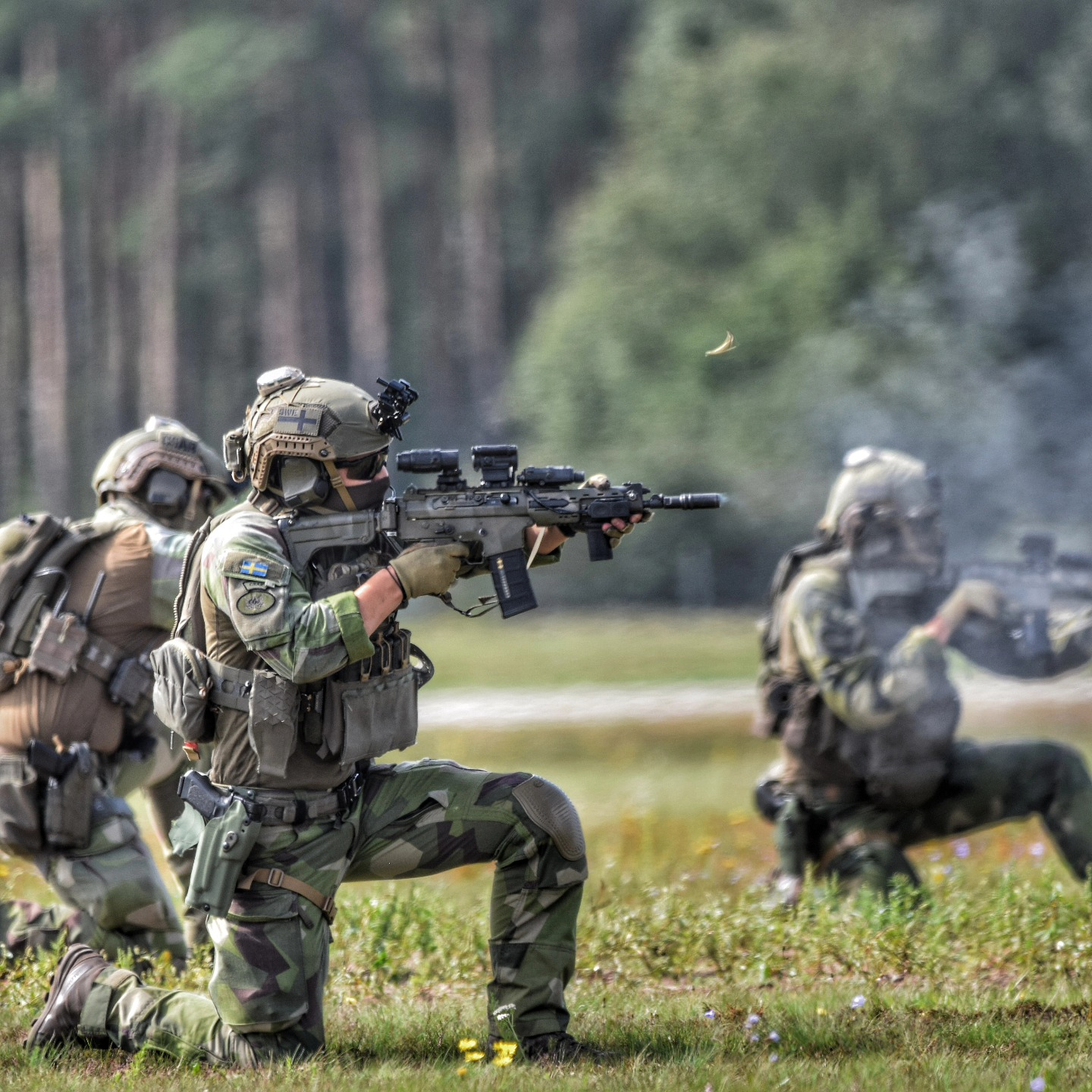
Air Force Rangers during combat training.

The Air Force Rangers are trained to operate in all climatic conditions and terrain found in Sweden as well as abroad. Their primary missions includes patrolling over long distances around air force installations as well as conducting reconnaissance in support of air force security operations, infiltrating enemy-controlled territory via helicopter, airplane, land based vehicles, boats or by feet to recover isolated personnel, and to provide close protection for deployed air assets.

- Reconnaissance: The Air Force Rangers conduct surface surveillance over large areas in order to detect, classify and eliminate security threats to different Air Force installations such as airbases. They can also be tasked with surveying and establishing temporary airbases or landing zones and conduct forward air control.
- Personnel recovery is conducted to recover downed and isolated personnel, military or civilian, as well as sensitive material. The task is performed over the entire conflict scale, but does not include hostage rescue.
- Force protection is conducted as an attachment to deployed air assets, be it fighter aircraft, transport aircraft or helicopters. The task is primarily conducted to ensure an acceptable level of close-in security for aircraft transiting airfields where security is unknown or additional security is needed to counter local threats.

Air Force Rangers have deployed during all major Swedish combat deployments since the late 1990s. Notably in Afghanistan, where patrols were manning Military Observations Teams (MOT's), provided onboard protection for air assets of the Swedish Air Element and CSAR readiness. Recently, patrols have deployed to Mali, providing close protection and personnel recovery readiness for the Swedish C130 deployed in country to support MINUSMA. The unit also participated in the evacuation of foreign nationals during the Sudanese civil war.

The unit had elements on standby to conduct personnel recovery during the Swedish contribution to the intervention in Libya as well.

== Organization ==
The Air Force Rangers can deploy in platoon sized units all the way down to individual rangers depending on the mission. They are organized in one company, consisting of a company staff group and two Ranger platoons, each platoon consisting of a command group and six Ranger patrols. The standard Air Force Ranger patrol is made up of six men:

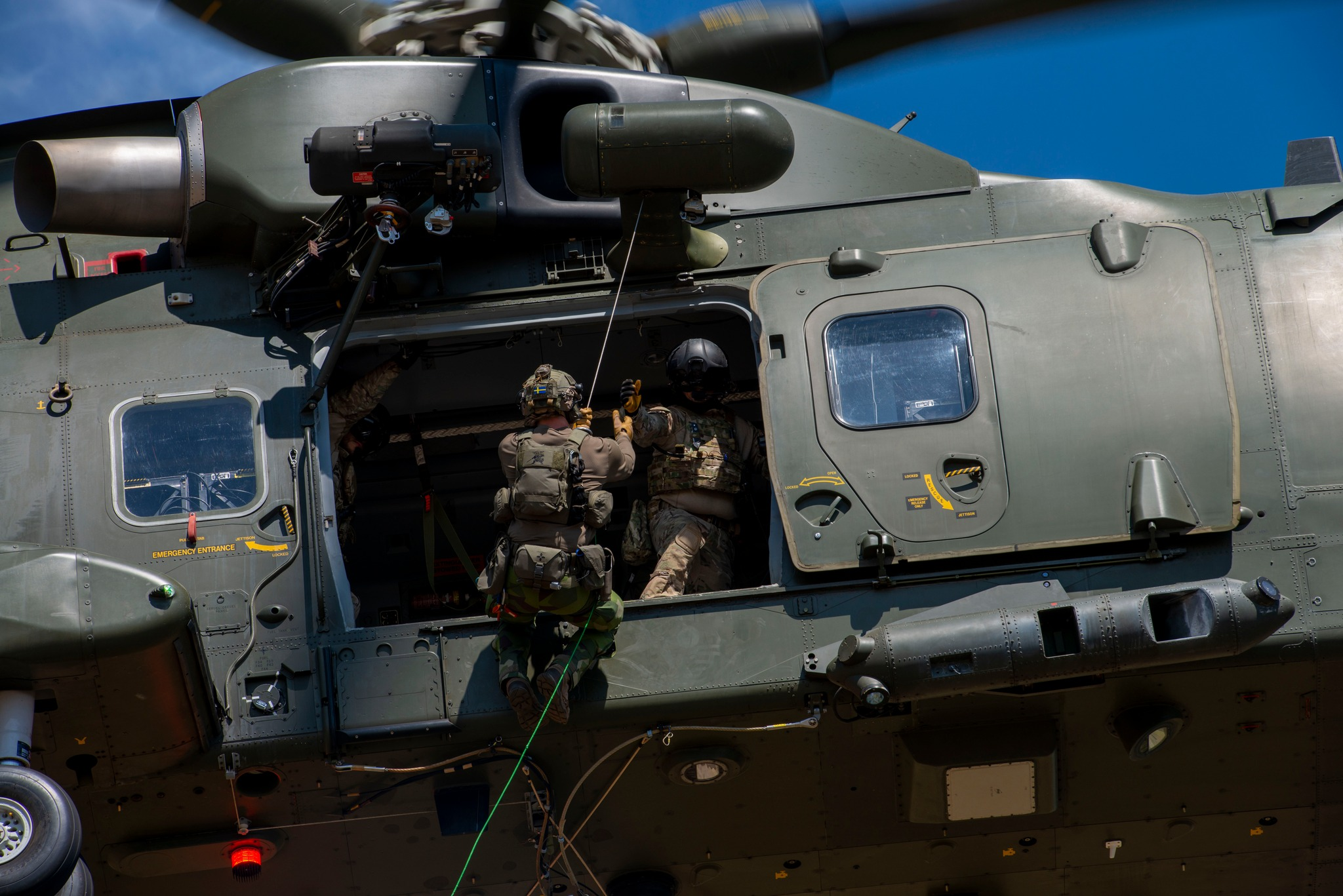
An Air Force Ranger prepares to rappell from a Danish AW101 helicopter.

- Patrol leader
- Deputy patrol leader/communications specialist
- K9 Handler
- 2 combat medics
- Sniper/weapons specialist

Military working dogs are fully integrated into Air Force Ranger operations, being of utility in the detection and tracking of enemy infiltrators, and for the location and recovery of isolated personnel. Due to the units large focus on personnel recovery the patrols normally include two medics which gives them the ability to provide advanced medical treatment to the isolated personnel they are recovering. All unit medics are qualified advanced medics (Sjv/A) and undergo a 22 week course.

Additionally, the company maintains a FRT (forward resuscitation team) with qualified medical personnel (nurses & doctors).

The Air Force Rangers have an active old comrades association which is open to all qualified personnel.

== Heraldry ==
The Air Force Rangers wear a green beret since February 1987. On 7 May 2002, the then Inspector General of the Air Force, major general Mats Nilsson decided that the Air Force Rangers should be assigned special training insignia. Their unit insignia consists of a lynx head surmounted two swords in saltire and an open laurel wreath. The lynx stands for flexibility and adaptation to new situations, in new environments. The swords means victory, conquest and success. The laurel wreath stands for knowledge and education. The insignia shows that the person has completed approved Air Force Ranger training.

== Similar units ==
- France – CPA (Air Parachute Commando)
- United States – Combat Control Teams (CCT)
- United States - PJs "Pararescue"
