= Dispersal (military) =

Practice of spreading out military assets to reduce collateral damage from enemy action

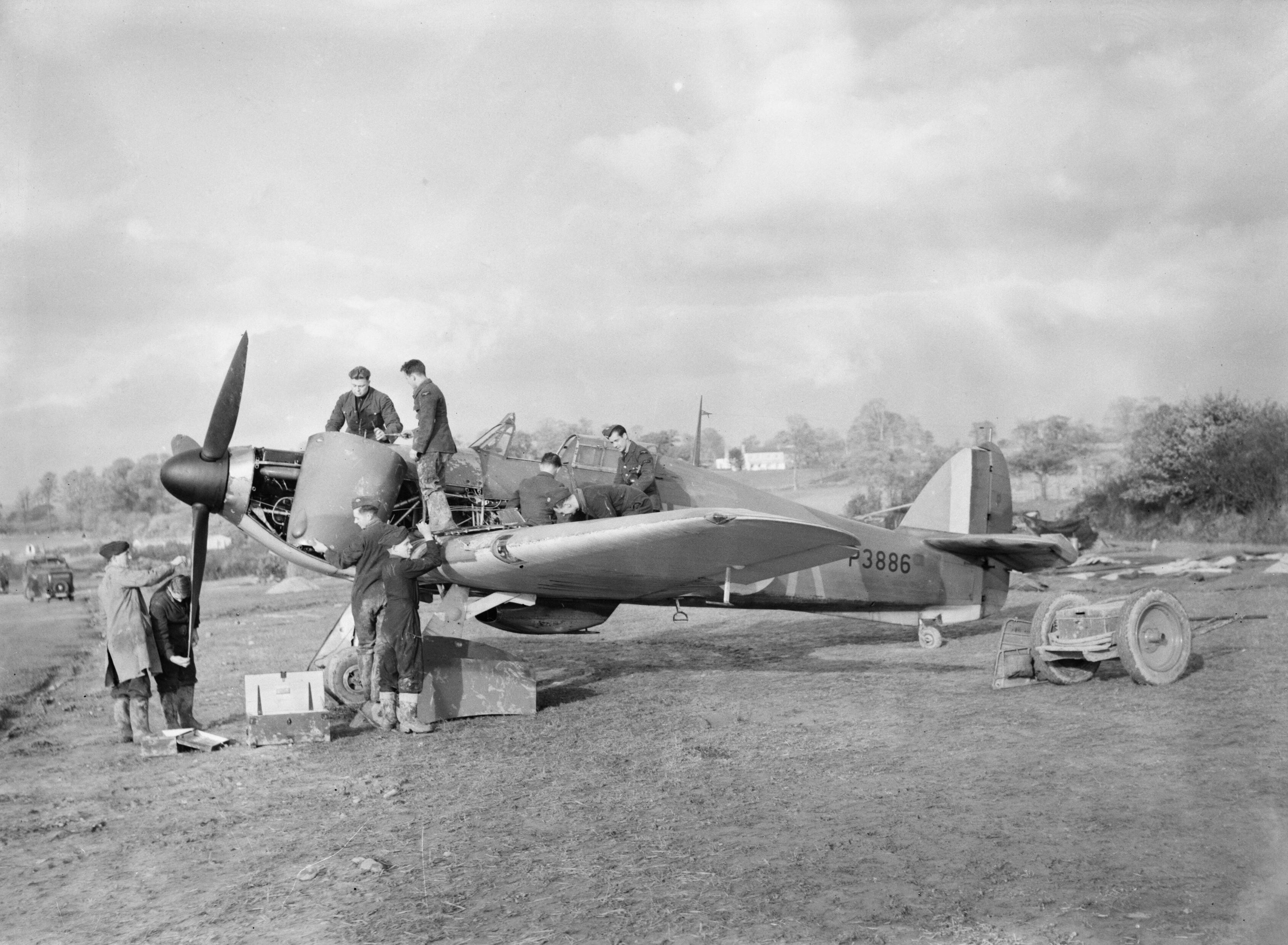
A Hawker Hurricane Mk.I of No. 601 Squadron RAF being serviced by Royal Air Force ground crew at an exposed dispersal at RAF Exeter, November 1940.

Dispersal is a military practice of dispersing or spreading out potentially vulnerable military assets, such as soldiers, aircraft, ships, tanks, weapons, vehicles, and similar equipment of an army, navy, or air force. Its primary objective is to minimise any potential effects of collateral damage, from incoming munitions such as artillery, bombs and missiles. Dispersal increases the number of artillery rounds needed to neutralise or destroy a military unit in proportion to the dispersal of the said unit. If a division doubles the area it takes up, it will double the number of artillery rounds needed to do the same damage to it. As more targets are spread out or dispersed, more artillery and / or bombs are required to hit all the individual targets.

It can also be used on a squad level, notably in counter-insurgency, to minimise the effects of grenades, land mines, improvised explosive devices (IEDs), explosive booby traps, and to a lesser extent, automatic gunfire. When individual soldiers are spaced apart, it is much more difficult for a single grenade to incapacitate them all.

Force dispersal may also be used in urban guerrilla warfare and as a tactic by militias to combat military intelligence instead of collateral damage. In this use, breaking up into covert cells is meant to make it harder to eliminate the whole organisation at once, and to reduce the damage when portions of it are discovered.

== Military aviation ==
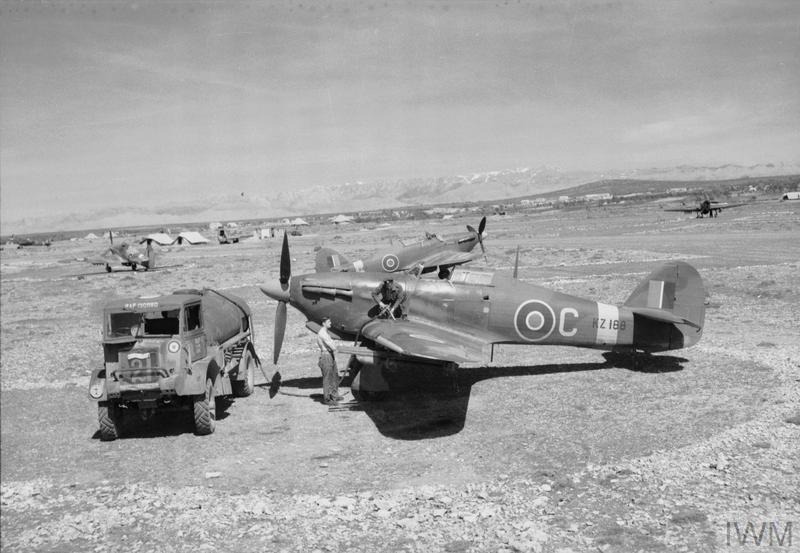
Airfield circular concrete pad dispersals at Prkos, Yugoslavia. A Hurricane Mk.IV KZ188 of No. 6 Squadron RAF is being refuelled by the attending bowser, 1944.

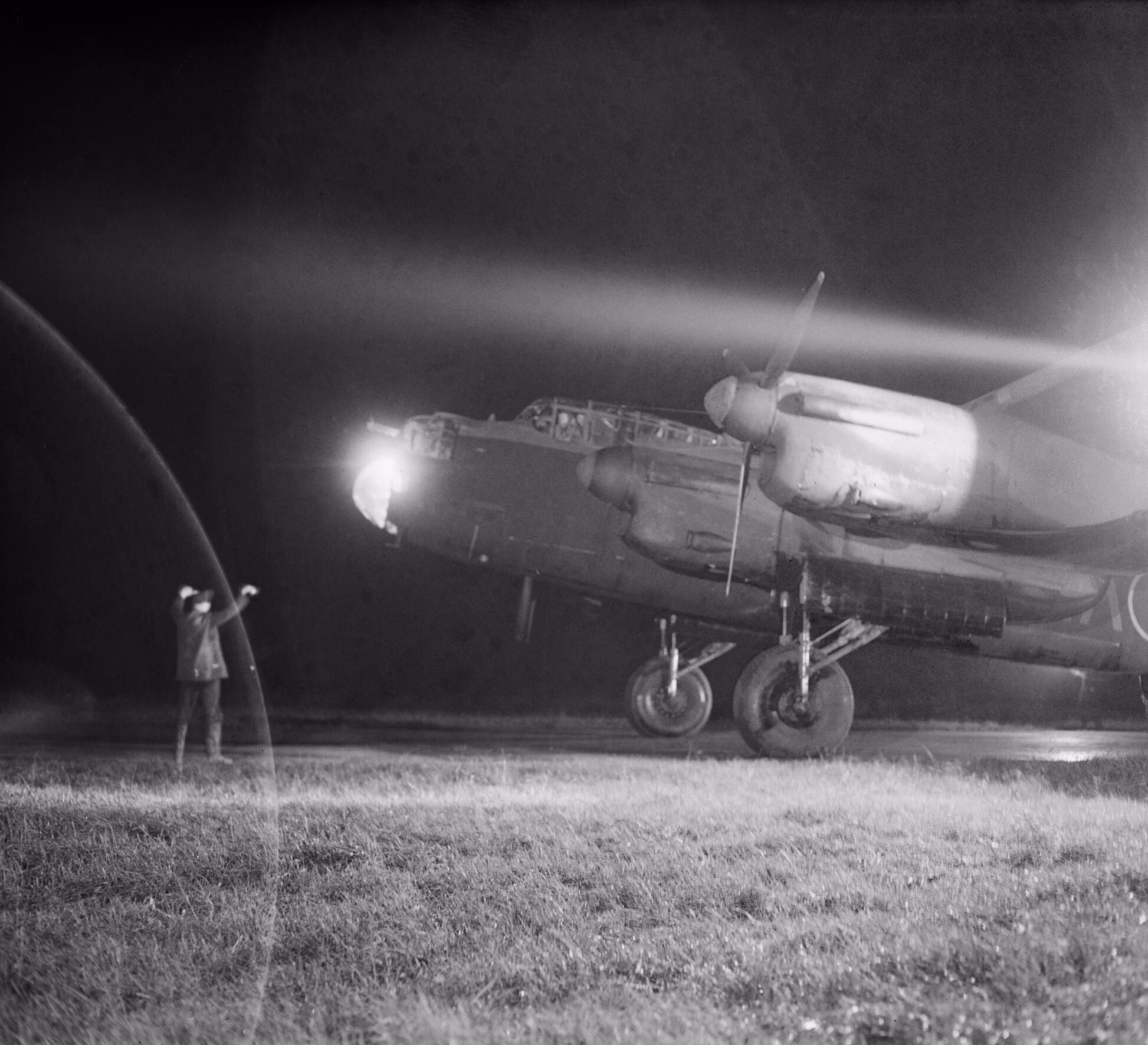
Heavy bomber aircraft dispersal. An Avro Lancaster Mk.III of No. 49 Squadron RAF is guided to its dispersal point at RAF Fiskerton in Lincolnshire, after returning at night from a raid on Berlin, 22 November 1943.

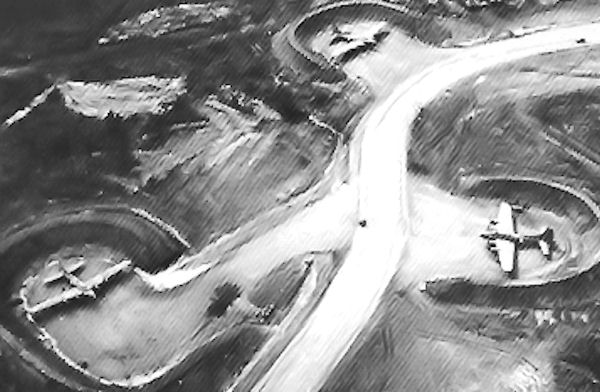
Three protected dispersals for bomber aircraft at Seven Mile Airfield, Port Moresby, New Guinea, August, 1942.

In respect of military aviation, dispersal of aircraft, especially fighter and bomber aircraft, was historically a very common strategy of planning, construction and operation of military aerodromes and airbases. Original military aerodromes would store their aircraft (when not being operated) in one or more large co-located facilities such as aircraft hangars; however, these were highly visible and therefore vulnerable easy prey for attacking forces; the successful bombing of an aircraft hangar could result in the destruction (or significant incapacitation) of the entire squadron (or more) of aircraft contained therein. The answer was to disperse individual aircraft around the aerodrome, and originally consisted of a number of individual parking spaces or hardstandings at various interval distances, typically around the perimeter track of class A airfields. These dispersed locations, originally being little more than an exposed circular (or similar-shaped) compacted earth or concrete pad a few metres from the perimeter track, originally had no protection or defence (from incoming munitions, nor inclement weather for protection of ground-crew required to operate on the aircraft).

With the ever-increasing accuracy of weapons targeting and delivery making individual aircraft dispersals viable targets, additional methods of protection were required; dispersed revetments were one of the first solutions for protection, and often consisted of raised earth banks (typically on three 'sides' of a C- or E-shaped structure to partially encircle an individual dispersal). More significant protection evolved with the construction of taller reinforced concrete blast walls for each dispersal. A notable example of surviving instances of both methods are found at the now former RAF Coltishall in Norfolk, England; on its north-western perimeter taxiway is a World War II-specific dual 'fighter pen' which could be used by a pair of Hawker Hurricane fighters, and along its south and south-eastern perimeter taxiways are a larger number of Cold War-era blast-wall protected dual dispersed revetments arranged in V formations, which afforded protection for jet fighters such as the contemporary Gloster Javelin. These structures at RAF Coltishall are now deemed significantly important structures of British military heritage, the WWII fighter pen and eight of the dual Cold War blast revetments have been granted scheduled monument protection by English Heritage (now known as Historic England).

The United States military utilised semi-circular covered shelters, albeit with an open front, with the distinctive appearance or style of half an igloo. Notable examples of these individual aircraft shelters are found at the former Marine Corps Air Station Ewa in Hawaii; they were constructed after many parked aircraft were destroyed during the Japanese raid on Pearl Harbor.

Further evolution of protection for dispersed aircraft resulted in the hardened aircraft shelter (HAS); effectively, a reinforced 'mini hangar' constructed of high-grade reinforced concrete with heavy-grade steel doors. A hardened aircraft shelter can typically accommodate two fighter aircraft, along with all required ground support equipment needed to facilitate the preparation for flight of said aircraft. Most hardened aircraft shelters (especially those constructed to NATO standards) are able to be hermetically sealed, thereby offering protection against ingress of any chemical and / or biological weapon.

Other notable examples of airbase dispersal include the Swedish Air Force's Bas 60 and later Bas 90 system.

=== Aircraft weapons storage ===
The storage of aircraft weapons on an airbase requires their dispersal away from workplace and accommodation locations of base personnel. The weapon storage area (WSA), also known as the 'bomb dump' in British military parlance, would typically be located in a remote area (often as far as physically possible) away from all other buildings and structures of an airbase, and consisted of a number of small protective bunkers, contained by security fences and access-limited gates.

In a further development, hardened aircraft shelters (HAS) were also able to facilitate dispersal for aircraft munitions, when a Weapons Storage and Security System (WSSS) vault, also known as Weapon Security and Survivability System (WS3), were constructed within the floor of the HAS, and enabled the safe and secure storage of tactical nuclear bombs for use on aircraft within the HAS. This facility enabled the functions of weapons dispersal together with the operational requirement of quick reaction alert (QRA), whereby armed aircraft were required to be available in a state of high preparedness, allowing the QRA aircraft to be launched or 'scrambled' within a very short timeframe. The WSSS / WS3 eliminated the need for transporting of live lethal weapons by road vehicles from their remote weapon storage area to the required bomber aircraft.

== Gallery ==
Gallery of various dispersal methods and additional protective features
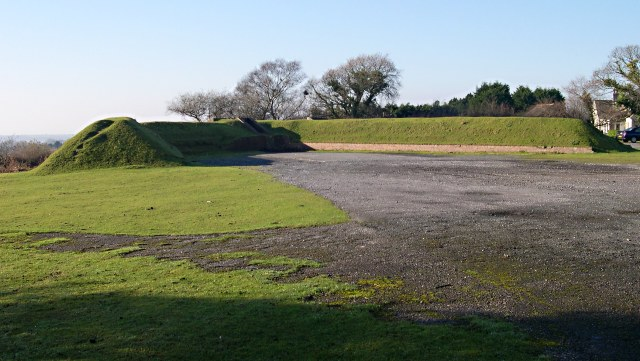
Airfield dispersal utilising a basic type of protected revetment consisting of raised earth banks, at the former RAF Harrowbeer.

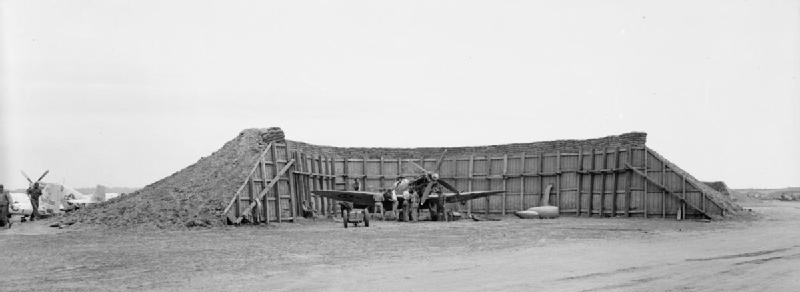
Raised earth banking protecting an airfield dispersal

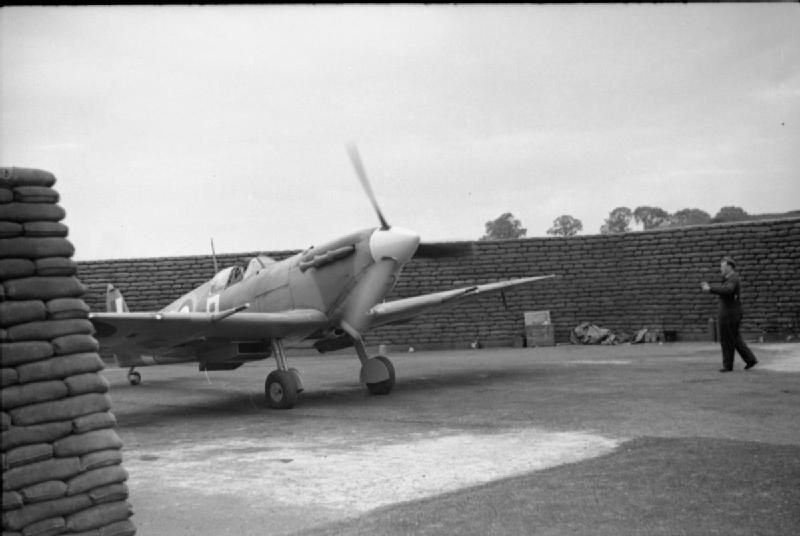
Circular airfield dispersal protected by a high wall of filled sandbags in a C layout

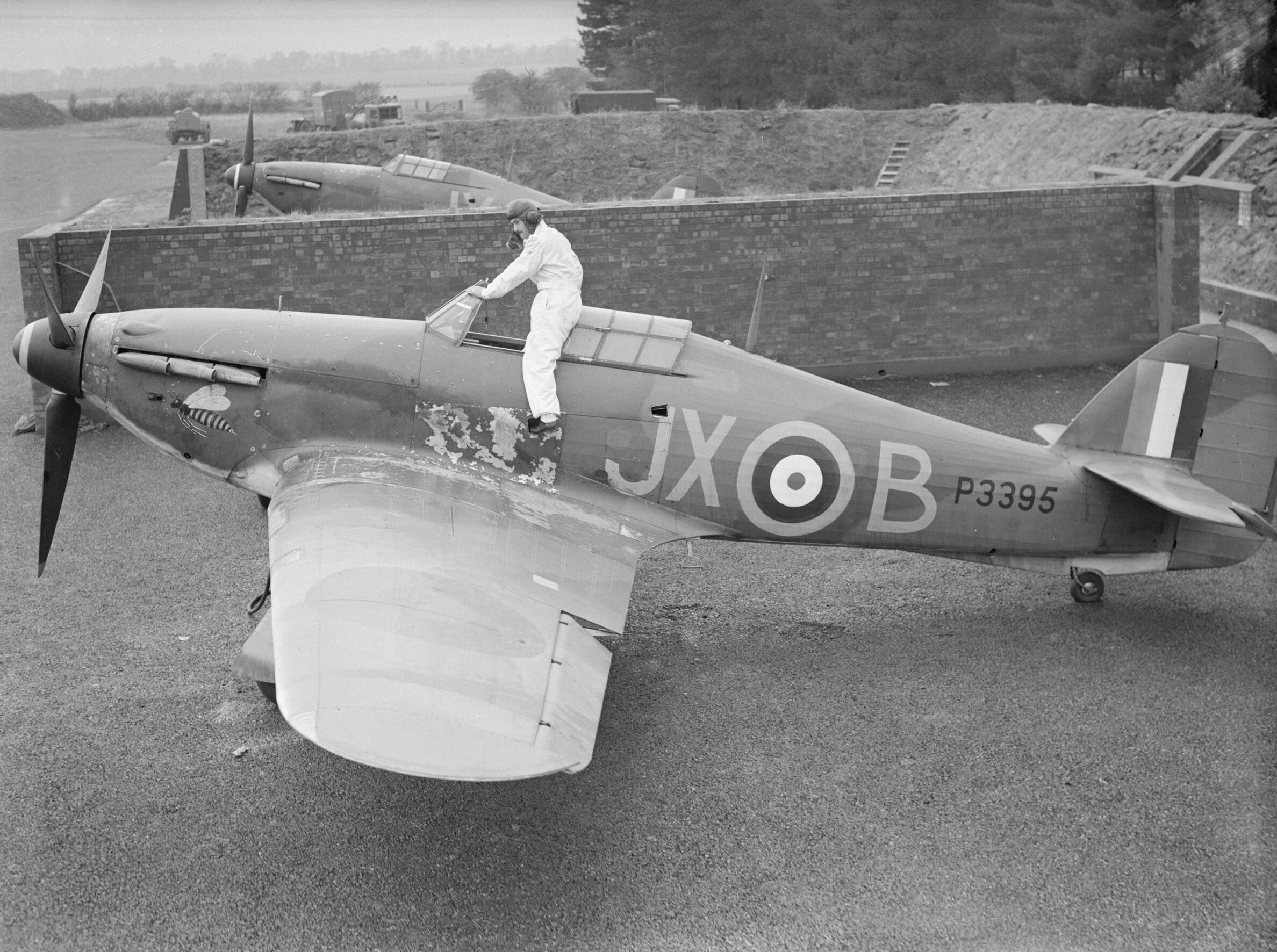
Airfield dispersal protected raised earth banking with a brick-built central divider in an E layout

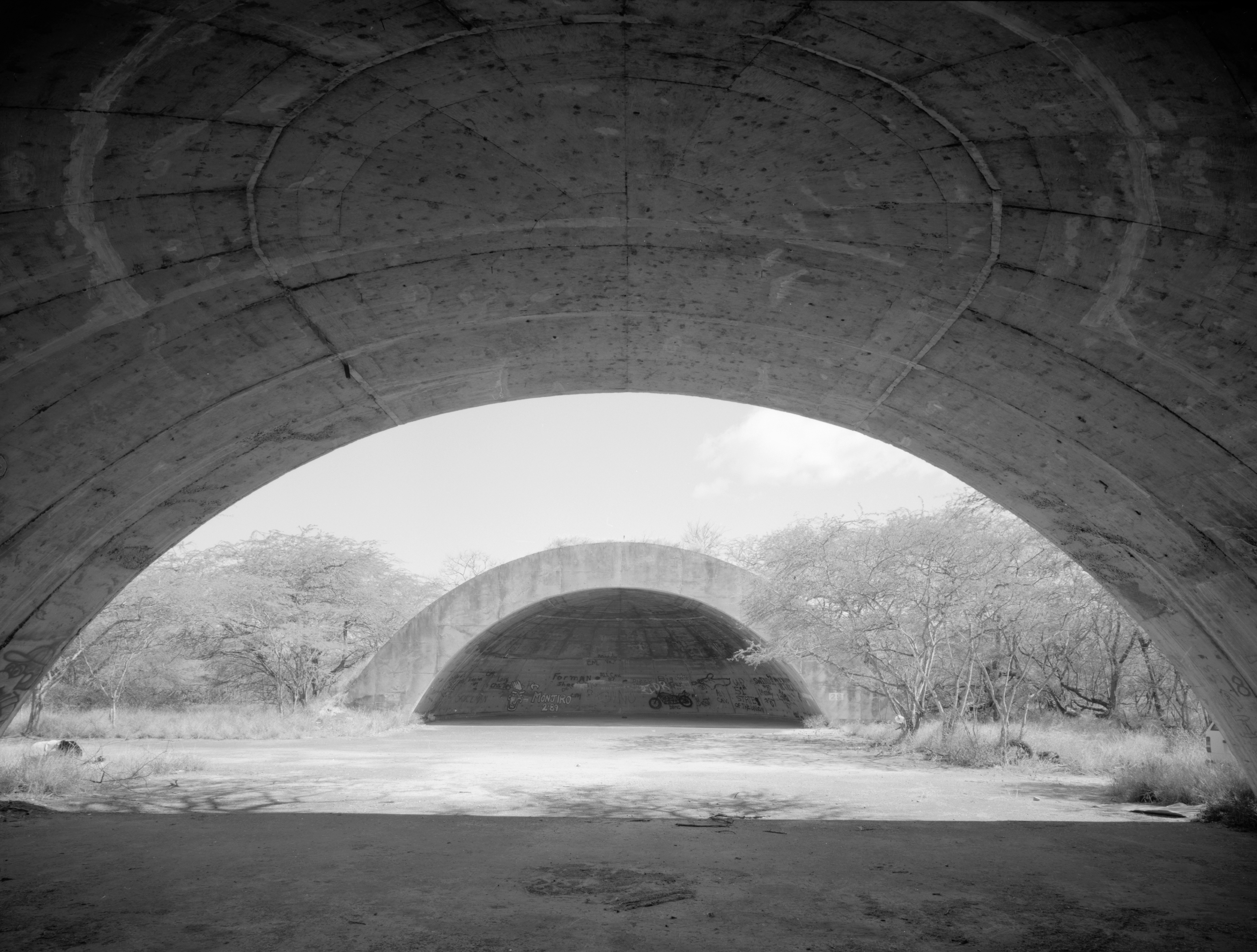
A distinctive half-igloo style of covered aircraft dispersal in Hawaii

== See also ==
- Force concentration
- List of military tactics
