= Hardstand =

Parking lot

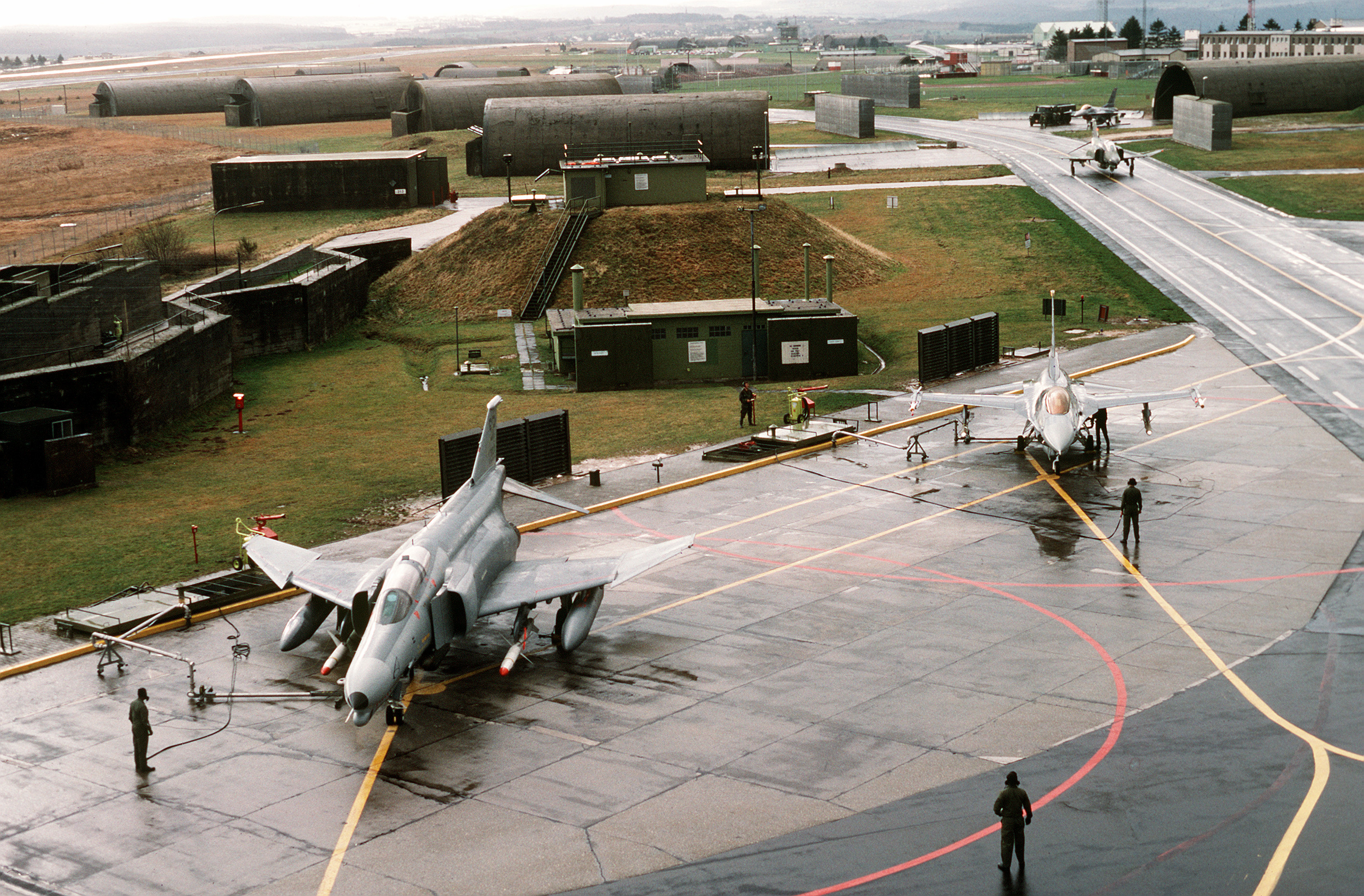
An F-4 Phantom and an F-16 Fighting Falcon aircraft on an area of hardstand

A hardstand (also hard standing and hardstanding in British English) is a paved or hard-surfaced area on which vehicles, such as cars or aircraft, may be parked. The term may also be used informally to refer to an area of compacted hard surface such as macadam.

== Uses ==
Hardstands are found at airports, military facilities, freight terminals, and other facilities where heavy vehicles need to be parked for significant periods of time. They also exist, paved or unpaved, at places where road vehicles are parked.

At airports, hardstands enable airliners to board or offload passengers using stair trucks or mobile ramps, and (on smaller aircraft) built-in airstairs, without needing dedicated jet bridges.

== Purpose ==
The purpose of a hardstand is to provide a strong surface for stationary vehicles, including where the vehicles may otherwise sink into the ground if left for extended periods of time. A hardstand is configured with a slope for drainage, which with unpaved surfaces serves to slow deterioration.

== Construction ==
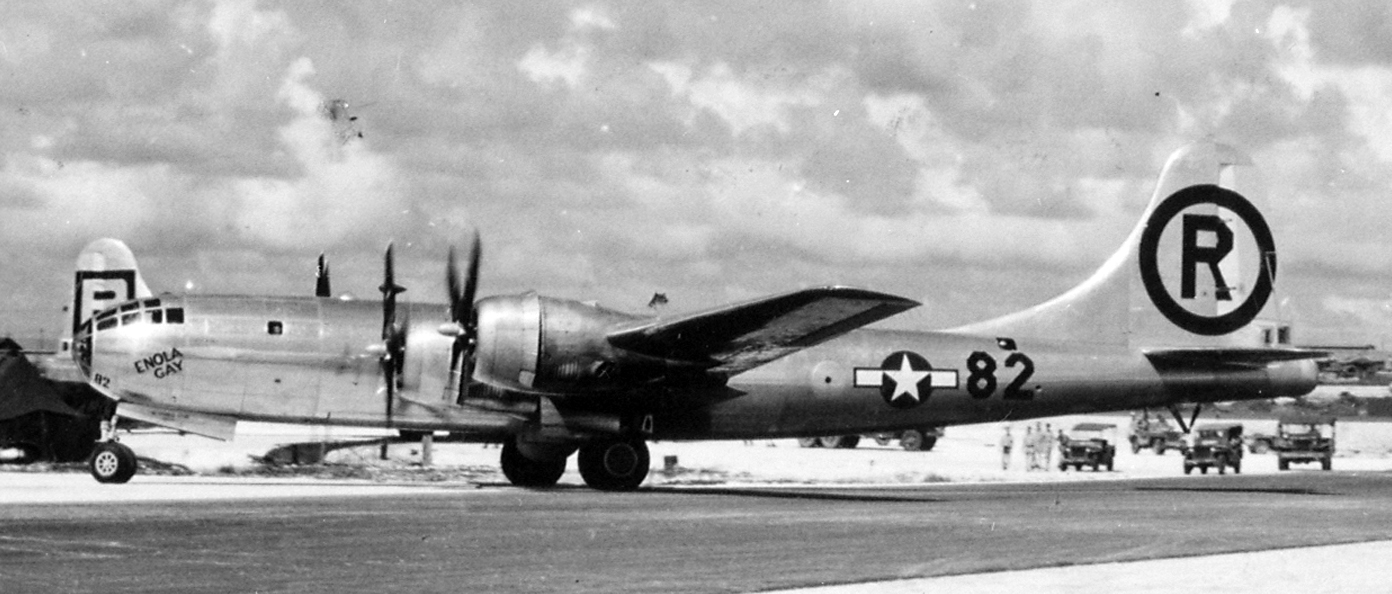
Enola Gay maneuvers into position at a hardstand on returning to North Field on Tinian following the atomic bombing of Hiroshima, 1945

Hardstands are paved with materials including concrete heavy-duty pavers, which give maintenance flexibility over other products as well as strength for the life of the project; or asphalt; or macadam. To support the weight of heavy vehicles such as large airplanes, tanks, or heavy trucks, the paving is usually thicker and more durable than in automobile parking lots.

== See also ==
- Index of aviation articles
- Airport apron
- Operational Readiness Platform (ORP)
