= Operation Focus =

Airstrike by Israel at the start of the Six-Day War in 1967

- Part of the Six-Day War
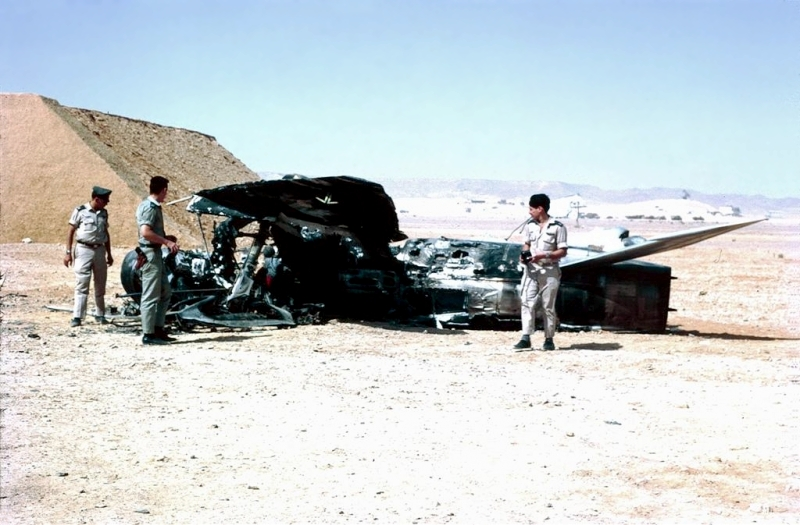
- Israeli Air Force officers next to a destroyed Egyptian MiG-21 at Bir Gifgafa.
- Operational scope: Air strike
- Planned by: Israel Defense Forces
- Objective: Destroy Egyptian, Jordanian, and Syrian aircraft
- Date: 5 June 1967
- Executed by: Israeli Air Force
- Outcome: Israeli victory: Israeli air supremacy over Egypt, Syria and Jordan

Operation Focus (Hebrew: מבצע מוקד, Mivtza Moked) was the opening airstrike by Israel at the start of the Six-Day War in 1967. It is sometimes referred to as the "Sinai Air Strike". At 07:45 on 5 June 1967, the Israeli Air Force (IAF) under Maj. Gen. Mordechai Hod launched a massive airstrike that destroyed the majority of the Egyptian Air Force on the ground. Following Syrian and Jordanian attacks in retaliation, the Israeli Air Force bombed air bases in those countries. By noon, the Egyptian, Jordanian and Syrian Air Forces, totaling about 450 aircraft, were destroyed. It was also very successful in disabling 18 airfields in Egypt, hindering Egyptian air operations for the duration of the war, and remains one of the most successful air attack campaigns in military history.

== Summary ==
The Israeli Air Force launched all but 12 of its nearly 200 operational jets, and consisting mainly of Dassault Mirage III, Dassault Mystère IV, Dassault Super Mystère, Dassault Ouragan, Sud Aviation Vautour and Fouga Magister. Aerial attacks were carried in three main waves, and several smaller waves in the days following the operation. A total of 452 enemy aircraft were destroyed, most of them on the ground. That left the IAF in almost complete control of the skies, and it was able to assist the Israeli Ground Forces units effectively.

The operational success was achieved by concentrating on the initial destruction of the runways with a new kind of weapon, a rocket-assisted anti-runway warhead. The prototype French/Israeli anti-runway weapon program uses rocket braking over the target to point the warhead directly toward the runway being attacked; at a set altitude, a second accelerator rocket ignites and drives the warhead through the pavement of the runway before it detonates. The explosion creates a small crater over a large new sinkhole, meaning the damaged runway section must be completely removed before the sinkhole can be repaired rather than a normal bomb crater which is simply filled in and patched. Once the runways were disabled, entire air bases' complements of aircraft were effectively grounded and fell victim to subsequent attack waves, resulting in near-total Israeli air supremacy.

== Timeline ==
=== 5 June 1967 ===
Egyptian aircraft destroyed on the ground

Egyptian defensive infrastructure was extremely poor, and no airfields were yet equipped with hardened aircraft shelters capable of protecting Egypt's warplanes in the event of an attack. The Israeli warplanes headed out over the Mediterranean Sea before turning toward Egypt. Meanwhile, the Egyptians hindered their own defense by effectively shutting down their entire air defense system: they were worried that rebel Egyptian forces would shoot down the plane carrying Field Marshal Amer and Lt-Gen. Sedky Mahmoud, who were en route from Almaza Air Base to Bir Tamada in the Sinai to meet the commanders of the troops stationed there. In this event it did not make a great deal of difference as the Israeli pilots came in below Egyptian radar cover and well below the lowest point at which Egypt's SA-2 surface-to-air missile batteries could bring down an aircraft.

The first Israeli wave attacked 11 bases, catching much of the Egyptian Air Force on the ground and destroying them before they got airborne. The Israeli jets then returned to Israel, were "quick-turned" (refueled and re-armed) in 7 minutes 30 seconds, and left in a second wave that attacked 14 Egyptian bases and returned with only minor losses. They "quick-turned" again and departed in a third wave.

The opening stages of Operation Focus were a complete success: Egypt's air force of nearly 500 combat aircraft was destroyed in the space of three hours, with only minor losses to the Israeli Air Force. When Syria, Jordan, and Iraq attacked Israeli targets in retaliation for the airstrike on Egypt, their attacks were largely ineffectual. In response many of the IAF planes headed for a third strike on Egypt were diverted en route to Syrian and Jordanian targets, and other IAF aircraft were sent against Arab ground forces in support of Israeli ground forces. By the end of the first day of the Six-day War, Israel had complete air superiority over Egypt, the Golan Heights, the West Bank, and the entire Sinai desert.

=== 6–10 June 1967 ===
On the second day of the war (6 June) the IAF was used against Egyptian, Jordanian, Syrian, and Iraqi ground forces.

On the third day (7 June) the IAF destroyed hundreds of Egyptian vehicles trying to flee across the Sinai in convoys and trapped thousands more in narrow Sinai passes. By the end of the third day Jordan's air force of 34 combat aircraft had been effectively destroyed.

By the sixth and final day (10 June) Syria had lost approximately 100 combat aircraft and the fighting was over.

== Aftermath ==
During the Six-Day War, the Israeli Air Force, with 250 combat aircraft at its disposal, employing 352 sorties, had prevailed over a coalition with approximately 600 combat aircraft. The IAF destroyed 452 enemy aircraft, including 79 in air combat, while losing 46 of its own. Twenty-four Israeli pilots and hundreds of Arab pilots were killed.

=== Number of aircraft destroyed by aircraft type ===
- Combat aircraft
  - 148 Mikoyan-Gurevich MiG-21 'Fishbeds' (104 from Egypt; 32 from Syria; 12 from Iraq)
  - 29 Mikoyan-Gurevich MiG-19 'Farmers' (all from Egypt)
  - 112 Mikoyan-Gurevich MiG-17 'Frescos' (94 from Egypt; 16 from Syria; two from Iraq)
  - 14 Sukhoi Su-7 'Fitters' (all from Egypt)
  - 27 Hawker Hunters (21 from Jordan; five from Iraq; one from Lebanon)
- Bomber aircraft
  - 31 Tupolev Tu-16 'Badgers' (30 from Egypt; one from Iraq)
  - 31 Ilyushin Il-28 'Beagles' (27 from Egypt; two from Syria; two from Iraq)
- Transport aircraft
  - 32 Ilyushin Il-14 'Crates' (30 from Egypt; two from Syria)
  - 8 Antonov An-12 'Cubs' (all from Egypt)
  - 4 Douglas C-47 Skytrains (two from Egypt; two from Syria)
- Transport helicopters
  - 10 Mil Mi-6 'Hooks' (eight from Egypt; two from Syria)
  - 6 Mil Mi-4 'Hounds' (two from Egypt; four from Syria)

=== Number of aircraft destroyed by country ===
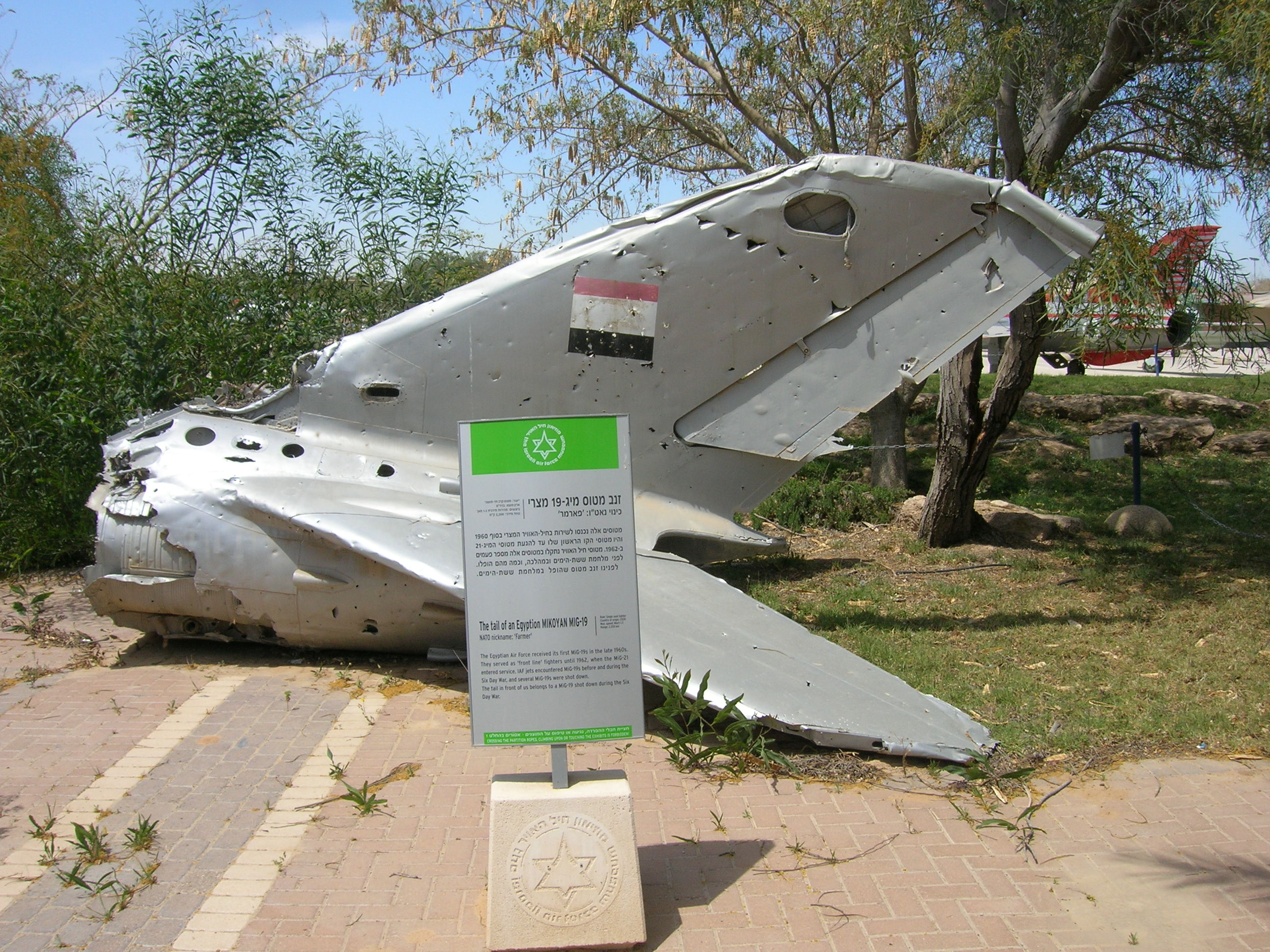
Tail of a downed Egyptian Mikoyan MiG-19

- Egypt: 338 aircraft
- Syria: 61 aircraft
- Jordan: 21 aircraft
- Iraq: 23 aircraft
- Lebanon: 1 aircraft
- Others: One British de Havilland Dove and one United Nations Douglas DC-3 were destroyed in the ground by Israeli fighters in Jordan.
- Israel lost 19 aircraft in the operation.

=== Totals by waves ===
1. First wave (7:45 am): 101 sorties; 11 airfields were attacked by 183 IAF aircraft; 197 Egyptian aircraft and 8 radar stations were destroyed. Five IAF pilots were killed and five more fell captive.
2. Second wave (9:30 am): 164 sorties; airfields were attacked; 107 Egyptian aircraft destroyed; Two Syrian planes destroyed in dogfights
3. Third Wave (12:15 pm): 85 sorties against Egypt, 48 against Jordan, 67 against Syria and one against H-3 air base in Iraq.
4. Other waves (afternoon & evening): two more sorties against H-3; several additional attacks on Egyptian airfields.

== Other effects ==
The effectiveness of the operation showed how vulnerable fixed air base installations were to aerial attacks at the time. This caused many nations' air forces to develop improved defensive measures against them, such as constructing hardened aircraft shelters to protect aircraft on the ground and establishing highway strips as alternative air bases.

== Sources ==
- Eric Hammel (October 2002). "Sinai air strike: June 5, 1967". Military Heritage. 4 (2): 68–73.
- Danni Shalom, Like A Bolt Out of the Blue: How the Arab Airforces were destroyed in the Six-Day War, BAVIR – Aviation Publications, 2002, 650 pages, hardcover.
- Oren, Michael B. Six Days of War: June 1967 and the Making of the Modern Middle East New York: Oxford University Press, 2002.
- Samuel M. Katz Israel's Air Force; The Power Series. Motorbooks International Publishers & Wholesalers, Osceola, WI. 1991.
