= United States nuclear weapons in Japan =

United States nuclear weapons were stored secretly at bases throughout Japan following World War II. Secret agreements between the two governments allowed nuclear weapons to remain in Japan until 1972, to move through Japanese territory, and for the return of the weapons in time of emergency.

== Nuclear war planning ==
In the 1950s, after U.S. interservice rivalry culminated in the Revolt of the Admirals, a stop-gap method of naval deployment of nuclear weapons was developed using the Lockheed P-2 Neptune and North American AJ-2 Savage aboard aircraft carriers. Forrestal-class aircraft carriers with jet bombers, as well as missiles with miniaturized nuclear weapons, soon entered service, and regular transits of U.S. nuclear weapons through Japan began thereafter.

U.S. leaders contemplated a nuclear first strike, including the use of those based in Japan, following the intervention by the People's Republic of China during the Korean War. A command-and-control team was then established in Tokyo by Strategic Air Command and President Truman authorized the transfer to Okinawa of atomic-capable B-29s armed with Mark 4 nuclear bombs and nine fissile cores into the custody of the U.S. Air Force.

The runways at Kadena were upgraded for Convair B-36 Peacemaker use. Reconnaissance RB-36s were deployed to Yokota Air Base in late 1952. Boeing B-50 Superfortress and Convair B-36 Peacemaker bombers were deployed to Japan and Okinawa in August 1953 to join B-29s already based there.

Following the Korean War, U.S. nuclear weapons based in the region were considered for Operation Vulture to support French military forces in Vietnam.

By the 1960s Okinawa was known as "The Keystone of the Pacific" to U.S. strategists and as "The Rock" to U.S. servicemen. Okinawa was critical to America's Vietnam war effort where commanders reasoned that, "without Okinawa, we cannot carry on the Vietnam war." During U.S. involvement in the Vietnam War the use of nuclear weapons was suggested in order to "defoliate forests, destroy bridges, roads, and railroad lines." In addition, the use of nuclear weapons was suggested during the planning for the bombing of Vietnam's dikes in order to flood rice paddies, disrupt the North Vietnamese food supply, and leverage Hanoi during negotiations. Each of the cold war plans employing a U.S. launched nuclear first strike were ultimately rejected.

Strategic Air Command had designated Kadena (as well as Yokota Air Base on the mainland), as a dispersal location for new airborne command post aircraft, codenamed "Blue Eagle", in 1965. The 9th Airborne Command and Control Squadron of the 15th Air Base Wing provided this airborne command and control to Commander in Chief Pacific Command from Hickam Air Force Base, Hawaii, after 1969. Specially-equipped United States Navy C-130s, operating from Japanese bases, enabled the National Command Authority to control Single Integrated Operational Plan (SIOP) processes for theater or general nuclear war. These exercises continued at least into the 1990s.

== Nuclear weapons deployment, storage and transit ==
Okinawa hosted 'hundreds of nuclear warheads and a large arsenal of chemical munitions,' for many years.

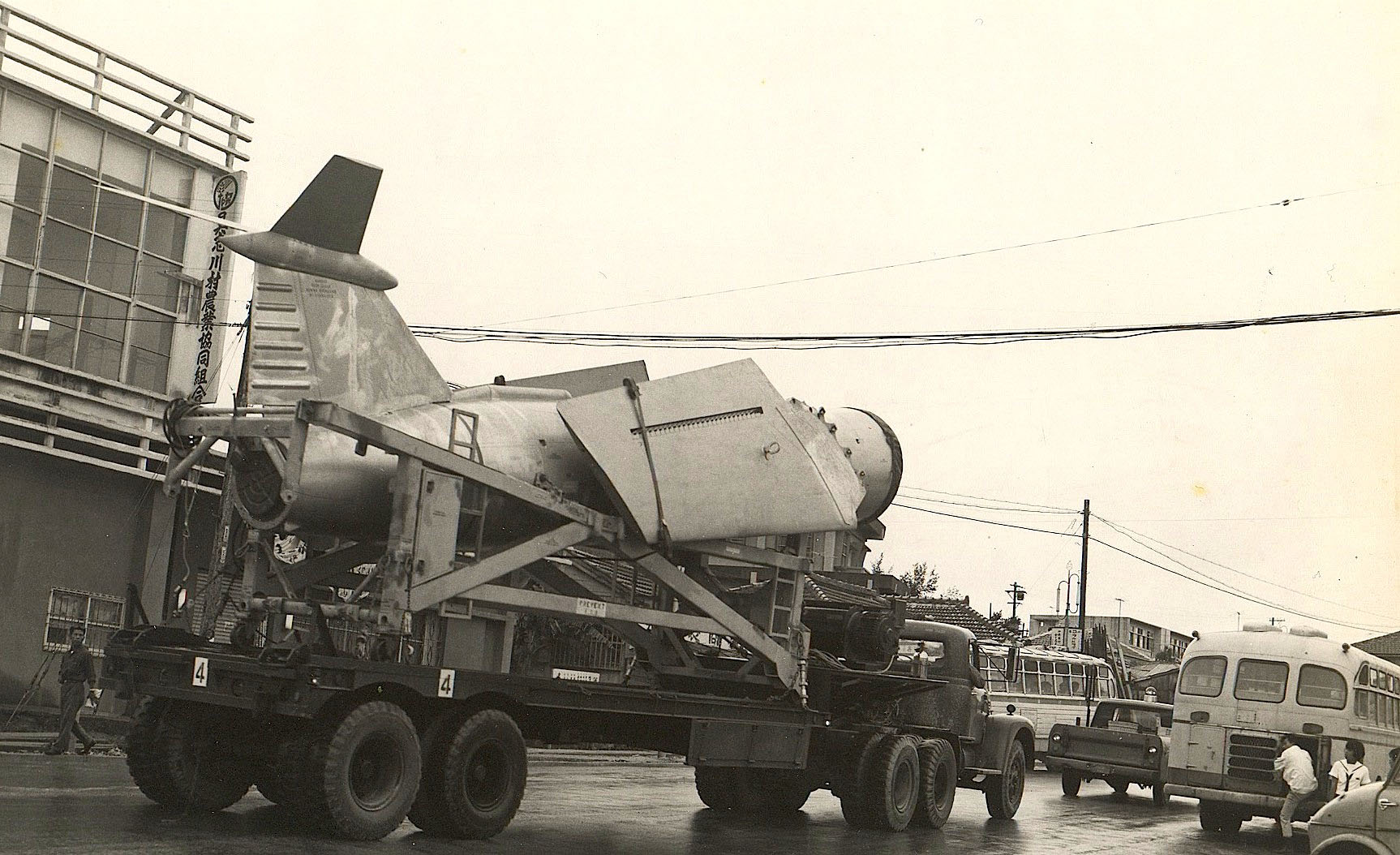
A TM-72 Mace missile is trucked through the Okinawa city of Gushikawa in the early 1960s in a rare open display.

Article 9 of the Japanese Constitution, written by the GHQ six months after the war, contains a total rejection of nuclear weapons. But when the U.S. military occupation of Japan ended in 1951, a new security treaty was signed that granted the United States rights to base its "land, sea, and air forces in and about Japan."

It is true that Chichi Jima, Iwo Jima, and Okinawa were under U.S. occupation, that the bombs stored on the mainland lacked their plutonium and/or uranium cores, and that the nuclear-armed ships were a legal inch away from Japanese soil. All in all, this elaborate strategem maintained the technicality that the United States had no nuclear weapons "in Japan."

In 1959, Prime Minister Nobusuke Kishi stated that Japan would neither develop nuclear weapons nor permit them on its territory". He instituted the Three Non-Nuclear Principles--"no production, no possession, and no introduction."

But when these non-nuclear principles were being enunciated, Japanese territory was already fully compromised, in spirit if not in letter. Although actual nuclear weapons were removed from Iwo Jima at the end of 1959, Chichi Jima, which had the same legal status, continued to house warheads with their nuclear materials until 1965. And Okinawa, of course, was chock-a-block full of nuclear weapons of all types until 1972. Nuclear-armed ships moored at U.S. Navy bases in Japan, and others called at Japanese ports without restriction...Yet, as compromised as it was, Japan's non-nuclear policy was not wholly fictitious. The Pentagon never commanded nuclear storage rights on the main islands, and it had to withdraw nuclear weapons from Okinawa in 1972...Undoubtedly, Japanese rulers firmly believed that the compromises they made with Washington were necessary for Japanese security during the dark days of the Cold War. Through it all, nonetheless, "non-nuclear Japan" was a sentiment, not a reality.

A 1960 accord with Japan permits the United States to move weapons of mass destruction through Japanese territory and allows American warships and submarines to carry nuclear weapons into Japan's ports and American aircraft to bring them in during landings. The agreement allows the United States to deploy or store nuclear arms in Japan without requiring the express permission of the Japanese Government. The discussion took place during negotiations in 1959, and the agreement was made in 1960 by Aiichiro Fujiyama, then Japan's Foreign Minister.

There were many things left unsaid; it was a very sophisticated negotiation. The Japanese are masters at understood and unspoken communication in which one is asked to draw inferences from what may not be articulated.

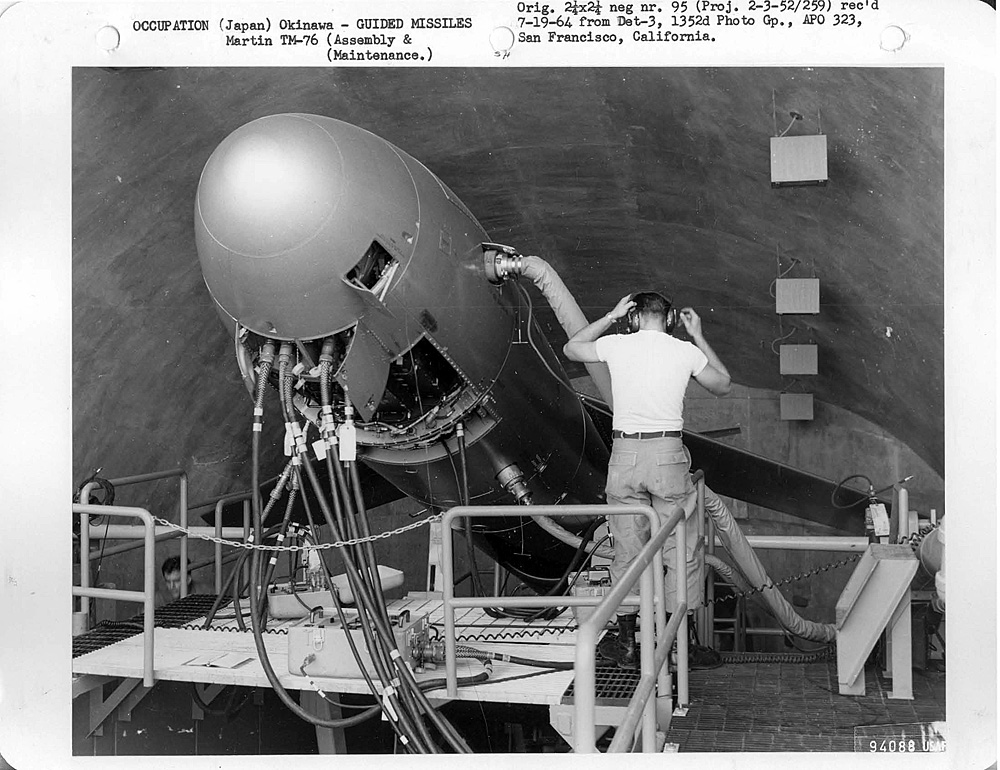
Technicians at work on a Mace B nuclear-armed cruise missile in a hard-site launcher on Okinawa in 1962

The secret agreement was concluded without any Japanese text so that it could be plausibly denied in Japan. Since only the American officials recorded the oral agreement, not having the agreement recorded in Japanese allowed Japan's leaders to deny its existence without fear that someone would leak a document to prove them wrong. The arrangement also made it appear that the United States alone was responsible for the transit of nuclear munitions through Japan. However, the original agreement document turned up in 1969 during preparation for an updated agreement, when a memorandum was written by a group of U.S. officials from the National Security Council Staff; the Departments of State, Defense, Army, Commerce and Treasury; the Joint Chiefs of Staff; the Central Intelligence Agency; and the United States Information Agency.

A 1963 national intelligence estimate authored by the Central Intelligence Agency, Japans Problems and Prospects stated that:

Continued US administration of Okinawa will probably not become an active political issue in Japan during the next few years. The present government and sophisticated opinion recognize the importance of Okinawa to the defense of Japan and non-Communist Asia. If the Japanese should come to believe that the rights or welfare of the Okinawans were being prejudiced or that the US intended to make the present administrative arrangements permanent, the leftists could whip up popular resentment, and the question of the return of the islands to Japan could become a major issue...

== Post-war governance of Southern Japanese Island chains ==
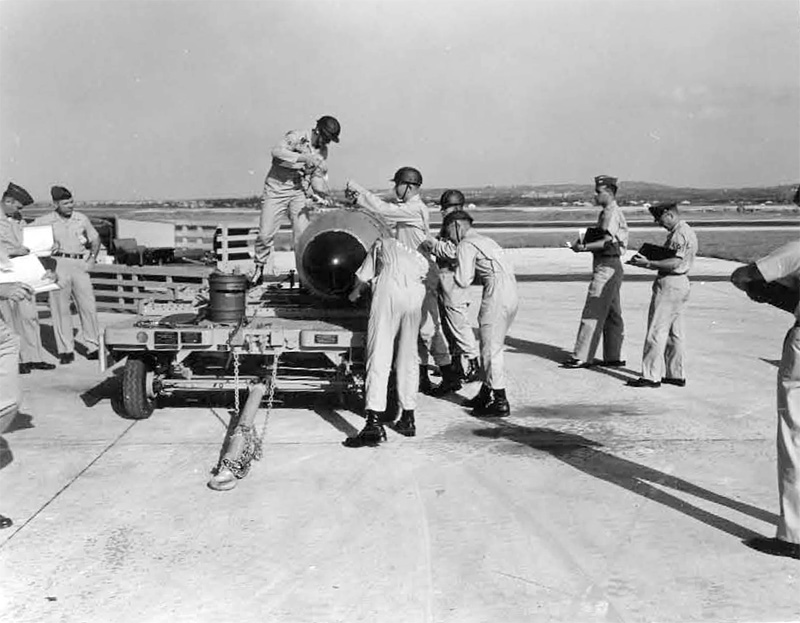
Mark 7 Atomic bomb being readied by the 8th Tactical Fighter Wing at Kadena Air Base

After the Battle of Okinawa the island was first placed under the control of the United States Navy. Following the surrender of Japan, the U.S military occupied Japan and Okinawa was put under control of the United States Military Government of the Ryukyu Islands on September 21, 1945, and an Okinawa Advisory Council was created. Following the war, the Bonin Islands including Chichi Jima, the Ryukyu Islands including Okinawa, and the Volcano Islands including Iwo Jima were retained under American control.

In 1952 Japan signed the Treaty of San Francisco that allowed the future control of Okinawa and Japan's southern islands by the United States Military Government (USMG) in post-occupation Japan. The United States Civil Administration of the Ryukyu Islands (USCAR), as part of the Department of Defense, maintained overriding authority over the Japanese Government of the Ryukyu Islands.

=== Return ===
The Johnson administration gradually realized that it would be forced to return Chichi Jima and Iwo Jima "to delay reversion of the more important Okinawa bases" however, President Johnson also wanted Japan's support for U.S. military operations in Southeast Asia." Prime Minister Eisaku Satō and Foreign Minister Takeo Miki had explained to the Japanese parliament that "the return of the Bonins had nothing to do with nuclear weapons yet the final agreement included a secret annex, and its exact wording remained classified." A December 30, 1968, cable from the U.S. embassy in Tokyo is titled "Bonin Agreement Nuclear Storage," but within the same file "the National Archives contains a 'withdrawal sheet' for an attached Tokyo cable dated April 10, 1968, titled 'Bonins Agreement--Secret Annex,'". The Bonin and Volcano islands were eventually returned to Japan in June 1968. On the one-year anniversary of a B-52 explosion and near-miss at Kadena Prime Minister Sato and President Nixon met in Washington, DC where several agreements including a revised Status of Forces Agreement (SOFA) and a formal policy related to the future deployment of nuclear weapons on Okinawa were reached.

A draft of the November 21, 1969, Agreed Minute to Joint Communique of United States President Nixon and Japanese Prime Minister Sato was found in 1994. The English text of the draft agreement reads:

United States President:

As stated in our Joint Communique, it is the intention of the United States Government to remove all the nuclear weapons from Okinawa by the time of actual reversion of the administrative rights to Japan; and thereafter the Treaty of Mutual Cooperation and Security and its related arrangements will apply to Okinawa, as described in the Joint Communique. However, in order to discharge effectively the international obligations assumed by the United States for the defense of countries in the Far East including Japan, in time of great emergency the United States Government will require the re-entry of nuclear weapons and transit rights in Okinawa with prior consultation with the Government of Japan. The United States Government would anticipate a favorable response. The United States Government also requires the standby retention and activation in time of great emergency of existing nuclear storage locations in Okinawa: Kadena, Naha, Henoko, and the Nike Hercules units...

Japanese Prime Minister:

The Government of Japan, appreciating the United States Government's requirements in time of great emergency stated above by the President, will meet these requirements without delay when such prior consultation takes place. The President and the Prime Minister agreed that this Minute, in duplicate, be kept each only in the offices of the President and the Prime Minister and be treated in the strictest confidence between only the President of the United States and the Prime Minister of Japan.

== Nuclear weapons bases in Japan ==
A declassified 1956-57 Far East Command manual, Standing Operating Procedures for Atomic Operations, revealed that, there were thirteen locations in Japan that "had "nuclear weapons or their components, or were earmarked to receive them in times of crisis or war." Among the nuclear-capable base locations were Misawa Air Base and Itazuke Air Bases and Yokosuka and Sasebo on U.S. Navy warships that held nuclear weapons. The Bulletin of the Atomic Scientists reveals that the other locations that held nuclear weapons in Japan were Johnson Air Base, Atsugi Air Base, Komaki Air Base, and Iwakuni Air Base.

=== Southern Japanese Island chains ===
The island chains were among the thirteen separate locations in Japan that had nuclear weapons. According to a former U.S. Air Force officer stationed on Iwo Jima, the island would have served as a recovery facility for bombers after they had dropped their bombs in the Soviet Union or China. War planners reasoned that bombers could return Iwo Jima, "where they would be refueled, reloaded, and readied to deliver a second salvo as an assumption was that the major U.S. Bases in Japan and the Pacific theater would be destroyed in a nuclear war." It was believed by war planners that a small base might evade destruction and be a safe harbor for surviving submarines to reload. Supplies to re-equip submarines as well as anti-submarine weapons were stored within caves on Chichi Jima.

=== Okinawa ===
At one point Okinawa hosted approximately 1,200 nuclear warheads. The Okinawa-based nuclear weapons included 19 different weapons systems.

From 1955–56 to 1960, the 663rd Field Artillery Battalion operated the Army's 280mm M65 Atomic Cannon ("Atomic Annie") from Okinawa. In the 1960s, nuclear storage locations included four MGM-13 Mace missile sites, Chibana at Kadena Air Base, Naha Air Base, Henoko [Camp Henoko (Ordnance Ammunition Depot) at Camp Schwab], and the Army MIM-14 Nike-Hercules air defense launch locations.

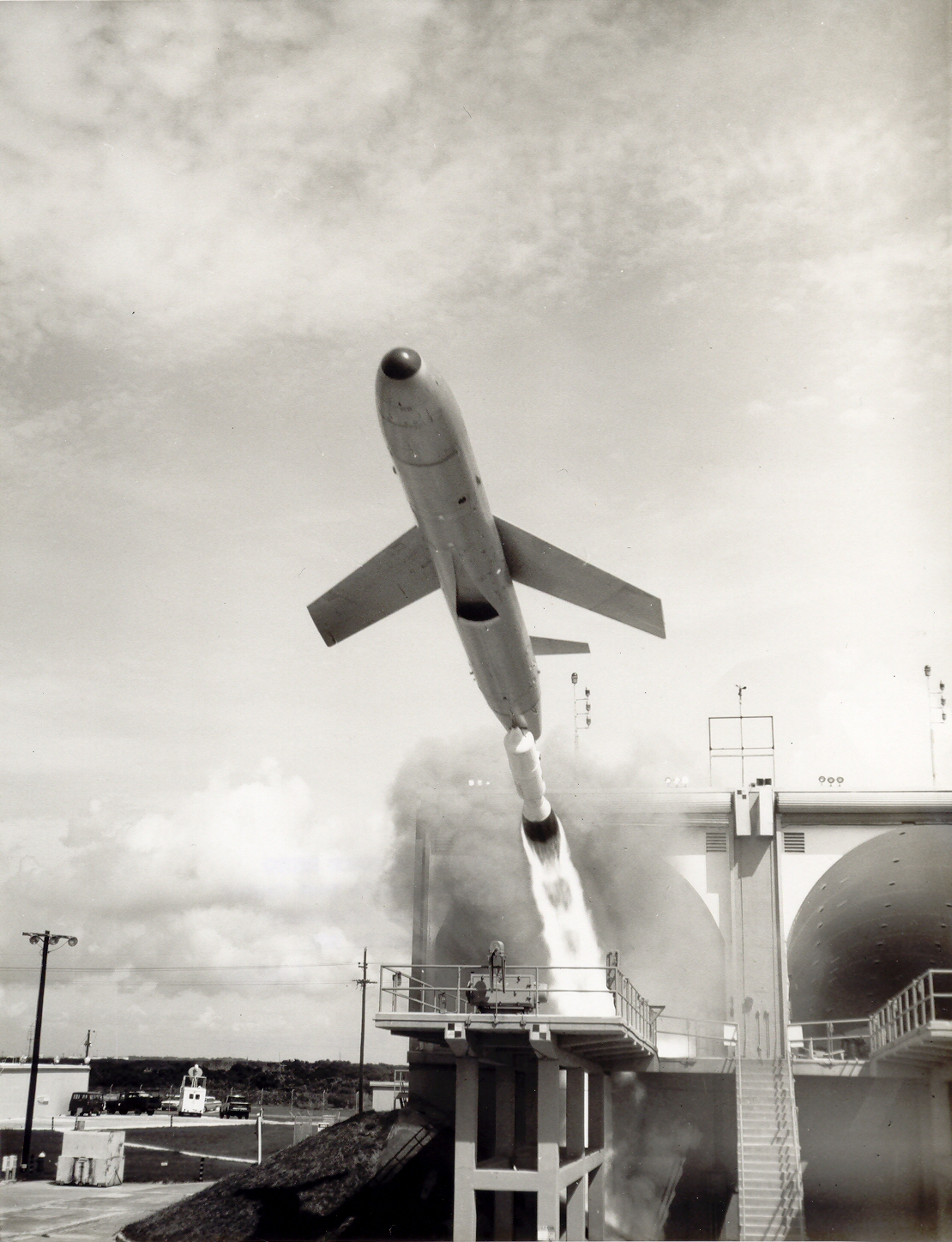
A MGM-13 MACE B missile launches from silo. The Okinawa-based 873d Tactical Missile Squadron may have received orders to launch Mace missiles against Sino-Soviet targets during the Cuban Missile Crisis.

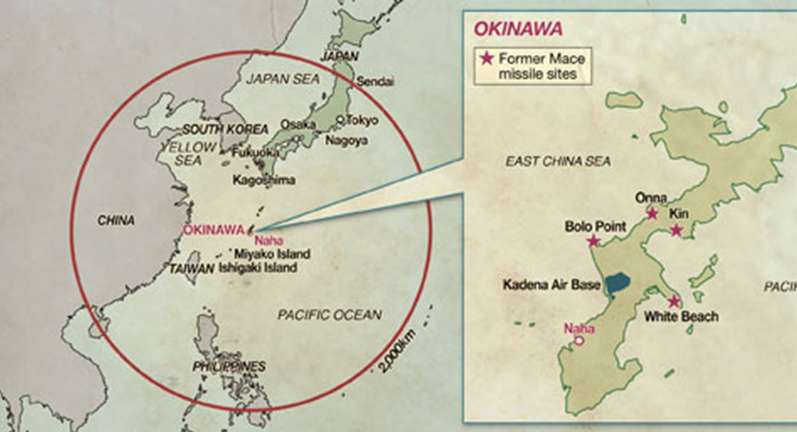
Former MGM-13 Mace missile launch sites on Okinawa

Nuclear Weapons in Okinawa

Weapon	Period	Date of withdrawal
Nonnuclear bomb	Jul 54	Jun 67
Bomb	Dec 54-Feb 55	Jun 72
M65 280mm gun	Dec 55-Feb 56	Jun 60
8-inch howitzer	Jun-Aug 57	Jun 72
MGM-1 Matador	Sep-Nov 57	Dec 60
Nuclear depth bomb	Dec 57-Feb 58	Jun 72
Special Atomic Demolition Munition	Feb-May 58	Jun 72
MGR-1 Honest John	Dec 57-Feb 58	Jun 72
MIM-14 Nike Hercules	Jan-Mar 59	Jun 72
MGM-5 Corporal	Mar 60	Jun 65
Mk 105 Hotpoint bomb	Jul-Sep 60	Dec 60
MGM-18 Lacrosse	Oct-Dec 60	Dec 63
MGM-13 Mace	Apr-Jun 61	Jun 70
AIM-26 Falcon	Jul-Sep 61	Jun 72
MGR-3 Little John	Apr-Jun 62	Dec 68
ASROC	Jan-Mar 63	Apr 66
RIM-2 Terrier	Jan-Mar 64	Jun 64
Davy Crockett	Apr-Jun 64	Dec 68
155mm howitzer	May 66	Jun 72

From 1961 to 1969, the 498th Tactical Missile Group operated the MGM-13 Mace nuclear-armed cruise missile on Okinawa. Thirty-two Mace missiles were kept on constant alert in hardened hangars at four Okinawa launch sites by the 873d Tactical Missile Squadron. The four Mace sites were assigned to Kadena Air Base and located at Bolo Point in Yomitan, Onna Point, White Beach, and in Kin just north of Camp Hansen.

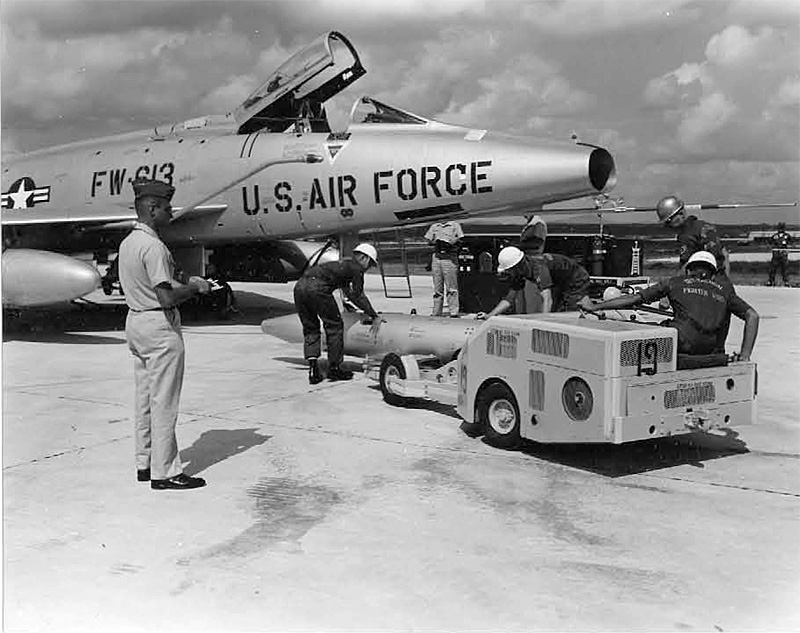
Mark 28 atomic bomb being transported to an F-100 by the 18th Tactical Fighter Wing on Okinawa

There were eight Nike-Hercules launch sites dispersed throughout the Ryukyu Islands. The Integrated Fire Control area (IFC) for the islands anti-air missile systems was located at Naha AFB. The Army's 97th Anti-Aircraft Artillery Group received Nike-Hercules SAMs in 1959, and with two name changes (the formation became the 30th Artillery Brigade (Air Defense) and then the 30th Air Defense Artillery Brigade), the U.S. Army continued to operate the Nike missiles there until June 1973, when all the Nike sites were turned over to the Japan Air Self-Defense Force.

North American F-100 Super Sabre fighter-bombers capable of carrying hydrogen bombs were also present at Kadena Air Base.

The Chibana depot held warheads for atomic and thermonuclear weapons systems in the hardened weapon storage area. The depot held the Mark 28 nuclear bomb warheads used in the MGM-13 Mace cruise missile as well as warheads for nuclear armed MGR-1 Honest John and MIM-14 Nike-Hercules (Nike-H) missiles.

Nuclear weapons were stored in Henoko at an ammunition depot adjacent to Camp Schwab. The depot was constructed in 1959 for the U.S. Army 137th Ordnance Company (Special Weapons).

In July 1967, a proposal to greatly expand the base at Henoko was made by the United States Department of Defense. The plan included construction of an expanded special weapon storage area to house nuclear weapons, a port, and runways adjacent to Camp Schwab. The plan was approved in 1968 by JCS Chairman Earle Wheeler and U.S. Secretary of Defense Robert S. McNamara, a fact that only came to light in 2016. The plan was not implemented over fears that the required seizure of civilian-owned land would cause protests to erupt as well as a decreased need in the drawn down of the Vietnam War, and budgetary restrictions. After reversion in 1972, Camp Henoko was created when the Army's Henoko Ammunition Storage Depot was turned over to the U.S. Marine Corps's Henoko Navy Ammunition Storage Facilities. The facility is now known as Henoko Ordnance Ammunition Depot.

== Nuclear weapons accidents ==
Nuclear weapons incidents on the island that were publicized garnered international opposition to chemical and nuclear weapons and set the stage for the 1971 Okinawa Reversion Agreement to officially ending the U.S. military occupation on Okinawa.

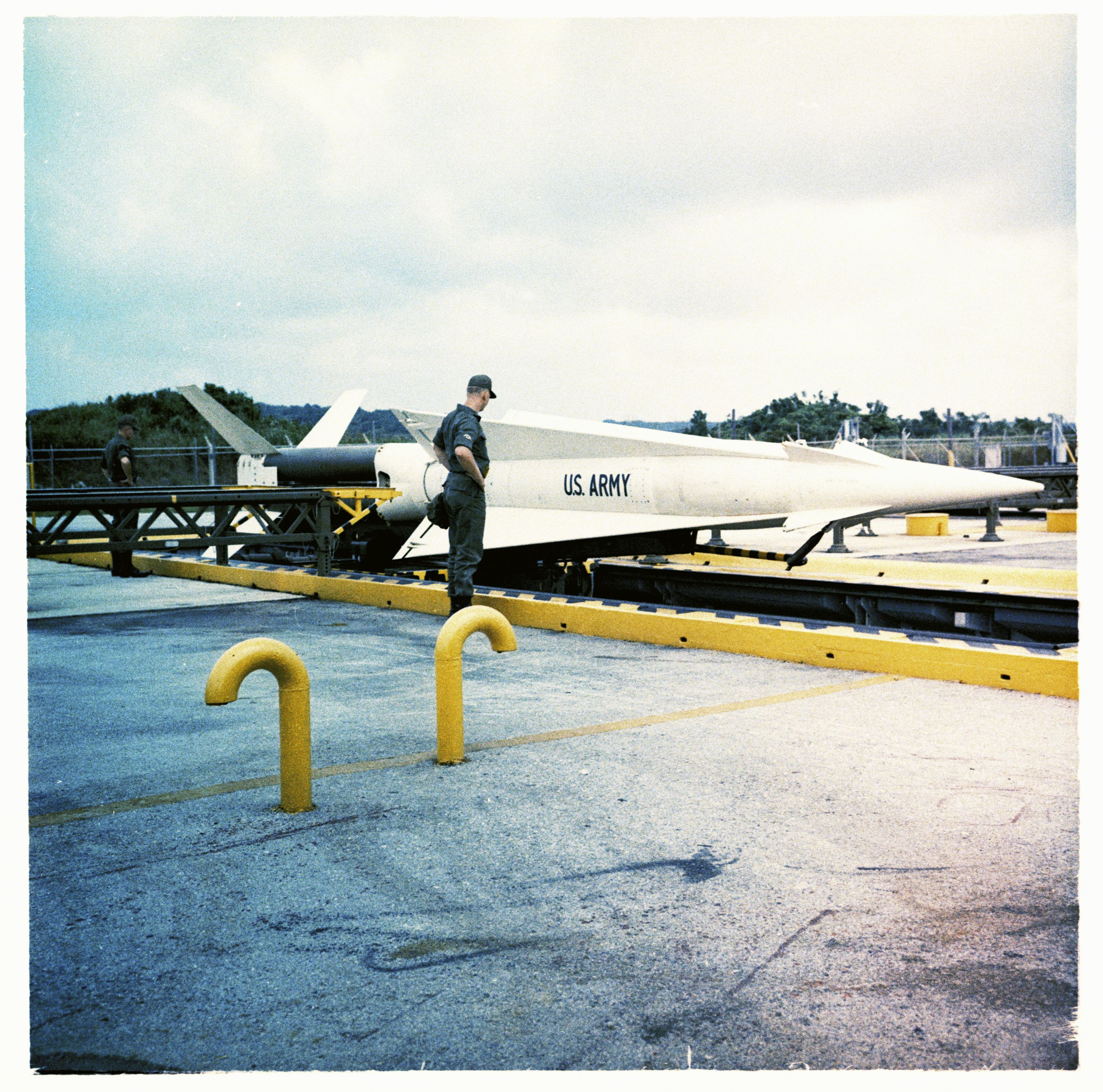
MIM-14 Nike-H missile at Okinawa, June 1967

In June or July 1959, a MIM-14 Nike-Hercules anti-aircraft missile was accidentally fired from the Nike site 8 battery at Naha Air Base on Okinawa which according to some witnesses, was complete with a nuclear warhead. While the missile was undergoing continuity testing of the firing circuit, known as a squib test, stray voltage caused a short circuit in a faulty cable that was lying in a puddle and allowed the missile's rocket engines to ignite with the launcher still in a horizontal position. The Nike missile left the launcher and smashed through a fence and down into a beach area skipping the warhead out across the water "like a stone." The rocket's exhaust blast killed two Army technicians and injured one. Similar accidental launches of the Nike-H missile had occurred at Fort George G. Meade and in South Korea. Newsweek magazine reported that following a highly publicized U.S. nuclear weapons accident in 1961, Kennedy was informed that, "there two cases in which nuclear armed anti-aircraft missiles were actually launched by inadvertence."

On October 28, 1962, during the peak of the Cuban Missile Crisis, U.S. strategic forces were at Defense Condition Two (DEFCON 2). According to missile technician John Bordne who served there, the four MACE B missile sites on Okinawa erroneously received coded launch orders to fire all of their 32 nuclear cruise missiles at the Soviets and their allies. Quick thinking by Capt. William Bassett who questioned whether the order was "the real thing, or the biggest screw up we will ever experience in our lifetime" delayed the orders to launch until the error was realized by the missile operations center. Capt. Bassett was the senior field officer commanding the missiles and was nearly forced to have a subordinate lieutenant who was intent on following the orders to launch his missiles shot by armed guards. No U.S. Government record of this incident has ever been officially released. Former missileers have contradicted Bordne's account.

Next, on December 5, 1965, in an incident at sea near Okinawa, an A-4 Skyhawk attack aircraft rolled off of an elevator of the aircraft carrier the USS Ticonderoga (CV-14) into 16,000 feet of water resulting in the loss of the pilot, the aircraft, and the B43 nuclear bomb it was carrying, all of which were too deep for recovery. Since the ship was traveling to Japan from duty in the Vietnam war zone, no public mention was made of the incident at the time and it would not come to light until 1981 when a Pentagon report revealed that a one-megaton bomb had been lost. Japan then formally asked for details of the incident.

In September 1968, Japanese newspapers reported that radioactive Cobalt-60 had been detected contaminating portions of the Naha Port Facility, sickening three. The radioactive contamination was believed by scientists to have emanated from visiting U.S. nuclear submarines.

At former nuclear storage areas in Okinawa, including at Henoko, where construction of a proposed air base for the relocation of MCAS Futenma has been planned adjacent to the weapon storage facility, environmental concerns have been raised by the findings of the Environmental Protection Agency of nuclear contamination at other U.S. nuclear weapons sites. The Status of Forces Agreement allows the U.S. military exemptions for environmental protection and remediation. In 1996 unused land inside the former-Chibana, now-Kadena Ammunition Storage Area was offered as a location to move the Futenma facility to. Okinawans residing near the base munitions area protested those plans, and the idea went unrealized. Later that year a location adjacent to the Henoko Ordinance Ammunition Depot at Camp Schwab was selected for the replacement facility.

=== 1968 B-52 Crash at Kadena Air Base ===
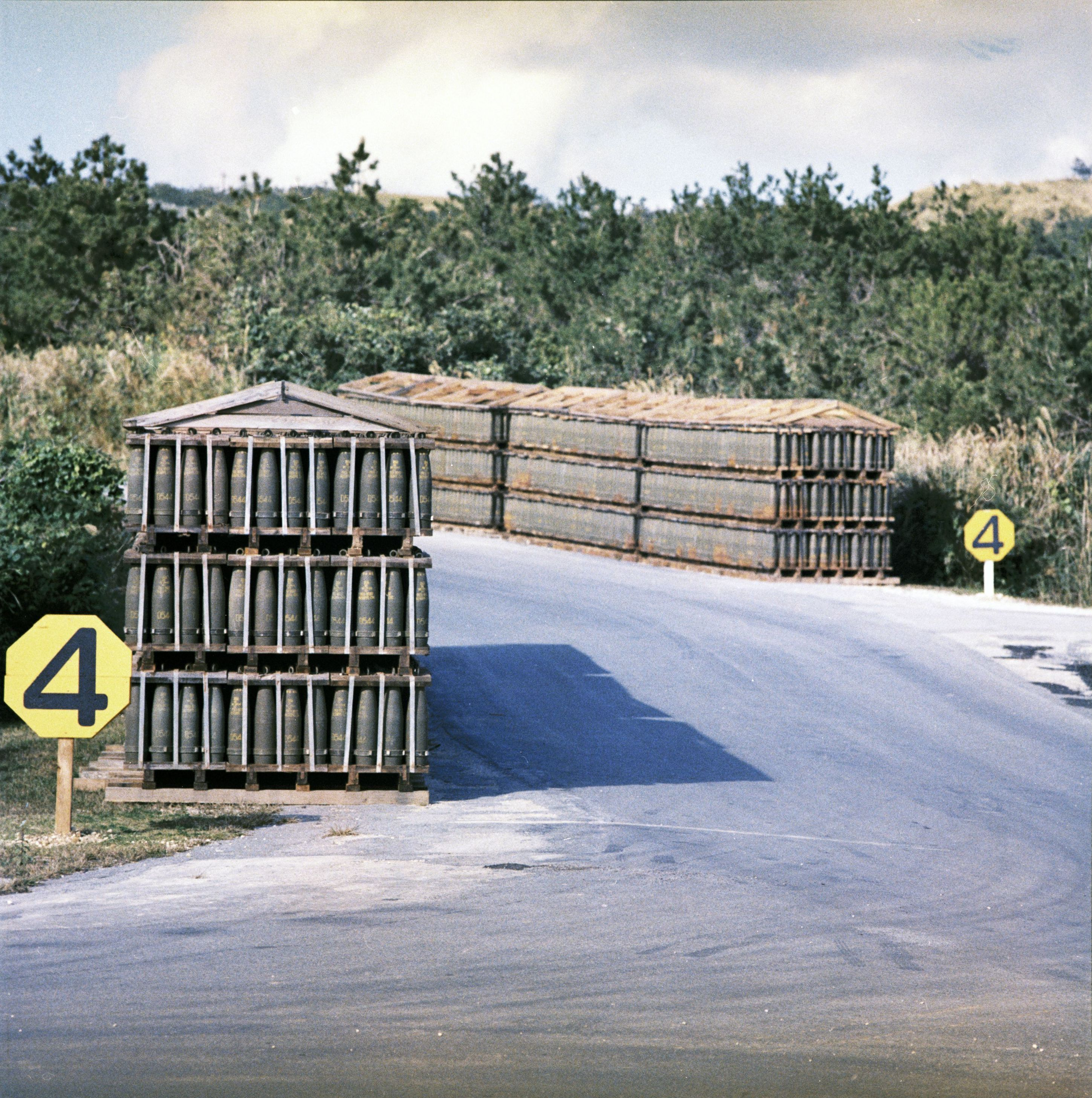
Thousands of artillery projectiles at Chibana Army Ammunition Depot, February 1969

On November 19, 1968, a U.S. Air Force Strategic Air Command B-52D Stratofortress with a full bomb load, broke up and caught fire after the plane aborted takeoff at Kadena Air Base, Okinawa before an Operation Arc Light bombing mission to the Socialist Republic of Vietnam during the Vietnam War. The pilot was able to keep the plane on the ground and bring the aircraft to a stop while preventing a much larger catastrophe. The aircraft came to rest near the edge of the Kadena's perimeter, some 250 meters from the Chibana Ammunition Depot.

The crash led to demands to remove the B-52s from Okinawa and strengthened a push for the reversion from U.S. rule in Okinawa. Okinawans had correctly suspected that the Chibana depot held nuclear weapons. The crash, together with a nerve gas leak from Chibana Depot the following year sparked fears that another potential disaster on the island could put the chemical and nuclear stockpile and the surrounding population in jeopardy and increased the urgency of moving them to a less populated and less active storage location.

== Weapon withdrawal ==
A U.S. policy to neither confirm nor deny the presence of nuclear weapons was created during the late 1950s when Japan's government asked for a guarantee that U.S. nuclear weapons would not be based "in Japan."

The U.S. eventually revealed the presence of nuclear weapons during negotiations over the 1971 Okinawa Reversion Agreement, which later returned sovereignty to Japan. In 1971, "the U.S. government demanded and received payment from the Japanese government to help defray the expenses of removing nuclear weapons from Okinawa".

During Okinawa's reversion to Japan in 1972, CINCPAC and the U.S. National Security Council (NSC) concluded that Japan's government "tacitly" allowed nuclear weapons to enter Japanese harbors on warships as had been outlined in earlier secret agreements with Japan. The effect of 1971 agreements were that the U.S. would remove nuclear weapons at sites in Japan in exchange for ships with nuclear weapons being permitted to visit ports. Nuclear weapons based on Okinawa were reportedly removed prior to 1972. However, though a diplomatic notification was suggested, permission from Japan was not a requirement for the return of U.S. nuclear weapons. In a 1981 interview, Reischauer confirmed, "U.S. naval vessels carrying nuclear weapons routinely visited ports in Japan with the tacit approval of the Japanese government, violating the LDP's oft-stated 'three non-nuclear principles' prohibiting their manufacture, possession, or introduction."

When Japan asserted that nuclear weapons must be removed after reversion, they were withdrawn from sites in Okinawa during the early 1970s. Kristensen writes that criticisms following a 1969 Far East visit by a U.S. Senate Foreign Relations Committee prompted the JCS in 1974 to order a study of the forward-deployed tactical nuclear weapons at East Asian bases. The study found the number of sites could be reduced because they had had more weapons than required, as well as that response teams at sites with nuclear weapons were unprepared for a coordinated attack and might be vulnerable to terrorists. Following the JCS order, the Department of Defense began withdrawing U.S. tactical nuclear weapons from Taiwan in 1974, and from the Philippines in 1976.

After reversion, the nuclear alert role on Okinawa increased and command and control aircraft continued to operate from the island. The U.S. continues to follow the policy of "neither confirm nor deny" regarding the present location of U.S. nuclear weapons and in many cases, of past locations.

== Subsequent developments ==
Early in March 2010, a Government of Japan inquiry revealed the existence of secret agreements for nuclear weapons brought into Japan. The panel findings ended decades of official denial about the secret nuclear agreements in Japan. The Liberal Democratic Party had been in power for the last 50 years. The long-ruling conservatives repeatedly denied the existence of pacts. In an effort by Prime Minister Yukio Hatoyama to restore public trust, the panel was set up by Japan's newly elected Democratic Party and its creation was motivated by an effort to increase transparency about the secret nuclear agreements with the U.S.

Japan's Foreign Minister Katsuya Okada revealed the findings of the panel and admitted that previous governments had lied to the Japanese public, over decades, about nuclear weapons agreements with the U.S. in violation of the country's non-nuclear principles. The pacts had been kept secret for over five decades over fears of public anger.

The existence of the secret pacts were already an open secret as the deals were already revealed in declassified U.S. files. One of the secret pacts was revealed in 1972 when Takichi Nishiyama, a reporter for Mainichi Daily uncovered one secret pact. He was convicted and jailed for obtaining it.

Four previously secret pacts were released in Japan as part of the announcement. The pacts showed different interpretations between the countries of restrictions and an "unspoken understanding" permitting port calls for warships without prior consent. The announcement revealed that an April 1963 meeting between Reischauer and Foreign Minister Masayoshi Ohira where a "full mutual understanding" on the "transit issue" was reached. The release also revealed a "vague" secret agreement over Japan's cost burdens for Okinawa's 1972 reversion to Japan.

Hans Kristensen, of the Federation of American Scientists said that at the time the country was facing a difficult decision between national security for Japan under a U.S. nuclear umbrella or telling the public the truth; the decision makers chose to be "economical with the truth." The pacts revealed that nuclear weapons could be returned to Japan during a military crisis in Korea.

In December 2015, the United States Government acknowledged officially for the first time that it had stored nuclear weapons in Okinawa prior to 1972. That U.S. nuclear weapons had been located in Okinawa had long been an open secret. The fact had been widely understood or strongly speculated since the 1960s and was subsequently revealed by the U.S. military in apparently unnoticed photographs of nuclear weapons and delivery systems on Okinawa that were declassified and released to the U.S. National Archives in 1990.

In March 2017, Japan joined the United States and the established nuclear powers under the Treaty on the Non-Proliferation of Nuclear Weapons who abstained from a negotiation on the total ban of nuclear weapons at the United Nations in opposition to 113 other signatory countries involved in discussion.

Submarines with cruise missiles from the United States visit the Yokosuka and Sasebo ports as part of routine U.S. Navy activities.

The Japanese government refused to respond to the survivors demands to join the Treaty on the Prohibition of Nuclear Weapons (TPNW) or participate in it as an observer, in order to maintain its continued reliance on and protection from the American nuclear umbrella.

== Nuclear sharing ==
On 27 February 2022, former prime minister Shinzo Abe proposed that Japan should consider a nuclear sharing arrangement with the US similar to NATO. This includes housing American nuclear weapons on Japanese soil for deterrence. This plan comes in the wake of the 2022 Russian invasion of Ukraine. Many Japanese politicians consider Vladimir Putin's threat to use nuclear weapons against a non-nuclear state to be a game changer. Abe wanted to stimulate necessary debate:

"It is necessary to understand how the world’s security is maintained. We should not put a taboo on discussions about the reality we face.”

In 2026, the Japanese Prime Minister Sanaa Takaichi announced that she would adopt a "realistic approach", and advocated for a reconsideration of the third principle of non-nuclear weapons (which prohibits the introduction of nuclear weapons to Japan).
