= Bomber Task Force =

Current concept for the USAF's strategic bomber fleet

Bomber Task Force (BTF) is a strategic mission that has been undertaken by the Air Force Global Strike Command (AFGSC) of the United States Air Force (USAF) since 2018 to help develop the ability to operate from unfamiliar locations and integrate with allies and partner nations. The BTF is a development of the USAF's Bomber Assurance and Deterrence Missions which began in April 2014. The missions regularly support both Pacific Air Forces (PACAF) and United States Air Forces in Europe – Air Forces Africa (USAFE-AFAFRICA) and are conducted by the USAF's strategic bomber fleet of B-1B Lancers, B-2A Spirits and B-52H Stratofortresses.

== History ==
=== 2018 ===
The Bomber Task Force mission was created as a response to the 2018 National Defense Strategy which called to develop Dynamic Force Employment where the USAF would use its forces to provide "proactive and scalable options for priority missions." The first Bomber Task Force deployment was undertaken by the 23rd Expeditionary Bomb Squadron (23rd EBS) who deployed four Boeing B-52H Stratofortresses to RAF Fairford, United Kingdom, from Minot Air Force Base, North Dakota, in January 2018. The principal aim of the deployment was to conduct theatre integration. This saw the first co-operation between B-52s and the Lithuanian Special Operations Forces. The 393rd Bomb Squadron (393rd BS) carried out the first BTF in the Pacific region, deploying three Northrop Grumman B-2A Spirits to Joint Base Pearl Harbor–Hickam, Hawaii, between 15 August and 27 September 2018. The aim of the mission was to assess the readiness of the B-2A and its airmen as well as to integrate with the local Hawaii Air National Guard units.

=== 2019 ===
The BTF mission concept was further developed in 2019 with a deployment of six B-52Hs to RAF Fairford in April 2019, with Col. Michael Miller explaining the deployment was to test whether the 2nd Bomb Wing "could pick up [their] wing, send it somewhere, and see if it [could] operate independently on its own." The deployment of six aircraft marked the largest to Europe since Operation Iraqi Freedom in 2003.

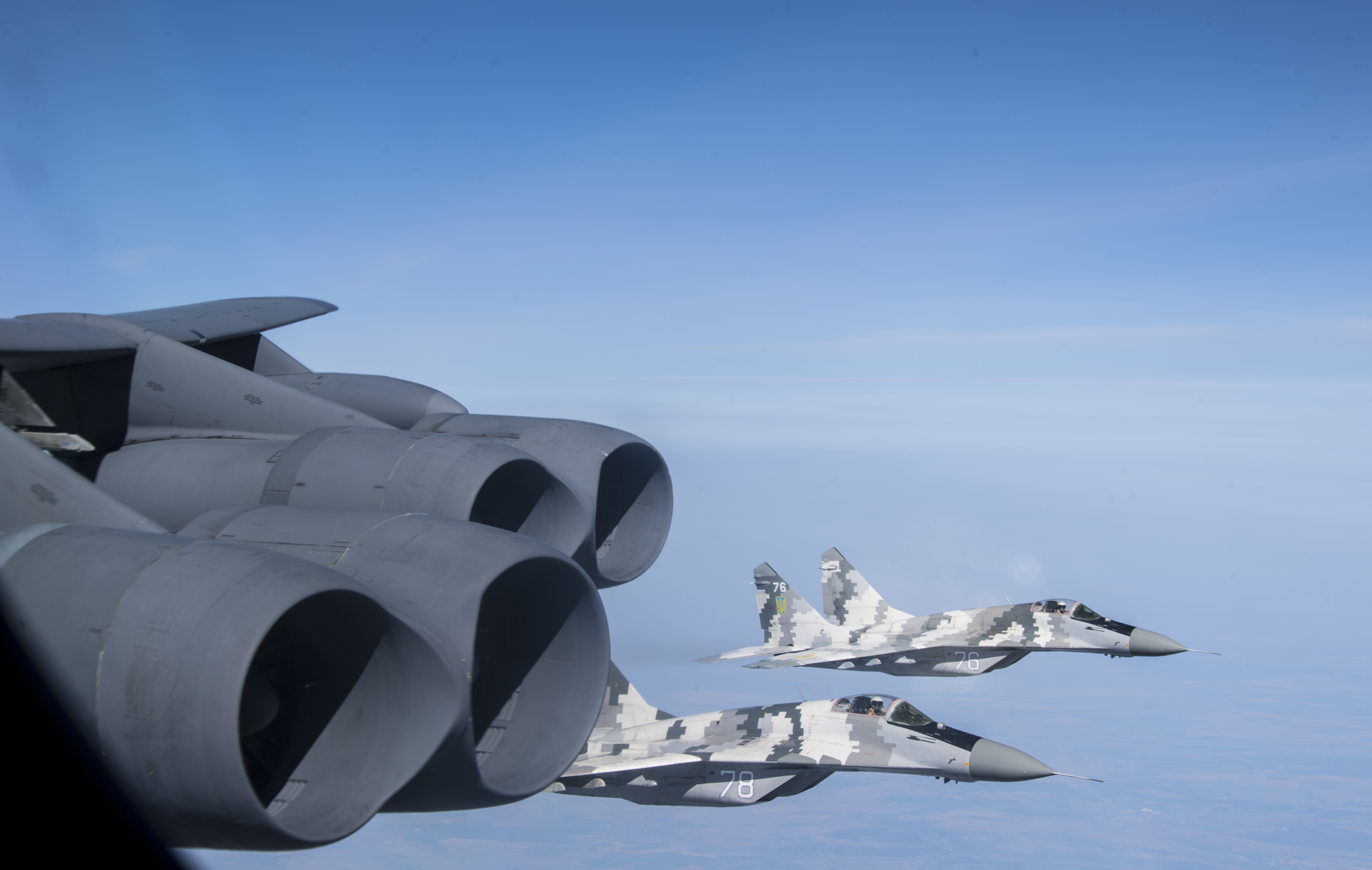
B-52H escorted by a pair of Ukrainian Air Force Mikoyan MiG-29s during a BTF mission, 2020.

=== 2020 ===
Four Rockwell B-1B Lancers of the 9th BS deployed to Andersen Air Force Base, Guam, from Dyess Air Force Base, Texas, in May 2020 as part of a BTF mission. It was carried out shortly after the USAF ended its 16-year long 'continuous bomber presence' in Guam in April 2020. Between August and September 2020, the 23rd EBS deployed six B-52Hs to RAF Fairford. Operating from Fairford, three B-52Hs carried out a sortie on 4 September seeing them overfly Ukraine, operating alongside the Ukrainian Air Force and NATO allies, flying close to Russian occupied Crimea. A subsequent mission saw a pair of B-52Hs carry out a simulated attack on Kaliningrad, integrating alongside Italian Air Force Eurofighter Typhoons.

=== 2021 ===
Between February and March 2021, four Rockwell B-1B Lancers from the 9th EBS deployed to Ørland Main Air Station in Norway. A sortie on 12 March saw a B-1B land in Poland for the first time, with a mission being conducted to Powidz Air Base. The BTF also marked the first time a USAF bomber squadron had deployed to Norway from where they operated in the European and Arctic regions.

=== 2022 ===
In February 2022, four B-52Hs of the 69th EBS deployed to RAF Fairford during the prelude to the Russian invasion of Ukraine. The aircraft stayed at Fairford until April, integrating with European allies and partners amidst the Russian invasion of Ukraine that began on 24 February. By 2022, the BTF concept had evolved into a method "to deploy a tailor-built task force of bombers in a Geographic Combatant Command."

=== 2023 ===
The 2023 Bomber Task Force milestones included the first hot-pit refuel missions of B-1B bombers in Turkey and Romania, and a visit to Sweden. B-2 bombers deployed to Keflavik Air Base in Iceland also took part in a hot-pit refuel mission in Norway. As part of the Bomber Task Force 23-3 mission, two B-1B bombers flew on a long range mission to Bosnia and Herzegovina where a low approach flyby was performed over Sarajevo.

=== 2024 ===
The 2024 missions saw the deployment of B-1B bombers for the first time to Sweden at the Luleå-Kallax Air Base as part of Bomber Task Force 24–2 in February. In July, two B-52 bombers were deployed to the Mihail Kogălniceanu Air Base, which marked the first deployment of US strategic bombers to Romania. The two B-52s were also intercepted by Russian fighters while crossing the Barents Sea but they continued on their course without any incident. On 25 July, the bombers conducted a 32-hour mission to the Middle East, integrating with the United States Marine Corps Forces Central Command before returning to their home base at Barksdale Air Force Base.
