= Young-Rainey STAR Center =

Coordinates: 27.8739°N 82.7483°W

The Young-Rainey Science Technology and Research Center, or Young-Rainey STAR Center is a high-technology and manufacturing center located in Pinellas County, Florida, United States. It currently houses over 30 businesses, which include a variety of administrative and light manufacturing operations, leased by the county's industrial development authority. It is named after Florida congressman Bill Young and Pinellas County Commissioner Charles Rainey,

The STAR Center is the former site of the Pinellas Plant, a nuclear weapon component manufacturing facility operated by the United States Department of Energy (DOE). It produced radioisotope-powered electronic components for the United States nuclear weapons program.

== History ==
In 1956, General Electric built the Pinellas Plant on a 96-acre (390,000 m^{2}) plot in Pinellas County, Florida. This site was formerly known as Bryan's Dairy Farm. In 1957, the site was sold to the United States Atomic Energy Commission. In exchange, GE was awarded a 25-year contract to operate the site. GE continued to operate the site for 35 years, until 1992. In 1992 the contract was transferred to Martin Marietta, who then announced the closure of the site that year.

In March 1995, the facility was formally sold by Martin Marietta, now Lockheed Martin, to the Pinellas County government. DOE and the Pinellas County government jointly redeveloped the site for commercial use. Portions of the subsurface soils and the shallow aquifer were contaminated with organic solvents and metals, and it was declared a Superfund site. Hundreds of employees of the plant developed cancer and other disorders of the lungs, skin and internal organs. The DOE radioactive and chemical environmental remediation and closure operations continued at the site until December 1997.

== See also ==
- Industrial buildings and structures in Florida
- Nuclear weapons program of the United States
- Superfund sites in Florida
