= Araújo =

Araújo or Araujo or Araúxo, and various other spellings, (Portuguese pronunciation: [ɐɾɐˈuʒu], Spanish: [aɾaˈuxo], Galician pronunciation: [aɾaˈuʃʊ]) is a Galician and Portuguese surname of noble medieval origin. The name is topographic and derives from various places named "Araújo" found on both sides of the bordering regions. The most prominent origin is likely the parish of Araújo in Valença, Portugal, near the Spanish border. The meaning of "Araújo" is debated, but a common theory traces it back to the Latin "altariculus" or "arauciculus," meaning "small altar." This suggests the original settlements named Araújo may have been located near ancient religious sites or places of worship. Therefore, it likely originated with people who lived in or were associated with these "Araújo" locations, with the name spreading as families migrated and established themselves elsewhere.

Don Rodrigo Anes (or Annes) de Araujo, lord of the ruined Araujo Castle and its lands located in present-day Ourense, Galicia, was the first to adopt the use of the surname.

His great-grandson Pedro Anes de Araújo relocated to the Kingdom of Portugal, around 1375, being the first Araújo to settle there.

== Origins ==
The use of the surname Araújo is believed to have been adopted by Don Rodrigo Anes, lord of Araújo Castle and its lands, located in the southern part of the medieval Kingdom of Galicia, in what is now the province of Ourense, Spain. The fortress occupied a strategic position on the frontier between southern Galicia and northern Portugal. Some historians attribute the earliest use of the surname to Vasco de Araujo, a medieval nobleman who may have used it as a distinguishing nickname.

== Lineage and the Reconquista ==
Rodrigo Anes is said to have descended from the royal houses of France and Burgundy through the knight Iohannes Tirante (Jean Tyranothe). Tirante, along with other knights from France and Burgundy, participated in the campaigns of the Reconquista, assisting in the expulsion of the Moors and the defense of Galicia. In return, the knights were granted lands, noble titles, and privileges.

== Historical records ==
Iohannes Tirante is documented in royal charters issued by Alfonso VII of León and his son Sancho III of Castile, where his name appears among nobles receiving privileges. He is also mentioned in a scroll dated 1139, which records his involvement in the reconstruction of a church in southern Galicia.

Tirante was the son of Fernando Annes, a Galician nobleman who was among the most powerful figures in the kingdom, and a French woman of noble origin, possibly descended from King Philip I of France or Duchess Hildegarde of Burgundy.

In 1128, Tirante was in Galicia with his father. He fought against the Moors and supported Alfonso VII in defending Galician interests against Prince Afonso Henriques, who sought to establish Portugal as an independent kingdom.

== The Battle of 1139 ==
According to Alexandre Herculano, Fernando Annes—known as Princeps Limiae (“principal of the Lima area”) for his governorship in southern Galicia—led the defense against Afonso Henriques in 1139. Chroniclers note that Iohannes Tirante, together with his father and allies, fought in this battle, defeating Henriques.

== Marriage and descendants ==
Iohannes Tirante married Mayor Garces de Asa, daughter of Count Don Garcia de Asa. The Asa family, descended from the Infantes of León, was one of the most influential in the kingdom. This marriage is often cited as the link between the Araújo family and the Asa lineage. From this union, Tirante had at least one son, Xoán Annes, who served as Captain of Arms under Alfonso VII. Xoán Annes is considered an ancestor of Rodrigo Anes, lord of the Araújo castle.

== Later history ==
In 1492, the Kingdom of Galicia, along with other Iberian realms, was incorporated into the Crown of Castile. During Spain's colonial era (16th–19th centuries), Galician nobles bearing the Araújo surname migrated to the Americas in service of the crown, contributing to the colonization of territories in North and South America.

Similarly, during Portugal's colonial expansion, individuals with the Araújo surname settled across the Portuguese overseas empire. Over time, the name Araújo became widely commemorated, appearing in place names, neighborhoods, streets, valleys, buildings, businesses, wineries, and even the plant species Araujia sericifera.

== See also ==
- Portuguese surnames
- Reconquista
- Ourense
- Kingdom of Galicia
- Portuguese Empire
- Spanish Empire
- Kingdom of France
- House of Burgundy

== Tributes ==
The bishop of Malacca, D. João Ribeiro Gaio, dedicated this quintilla to the Araújos:

Across the Bitorinho
in the land watered by the Miño River
there are now-worn graves of
famous Araújos,
ancient and magnified.

== Notable people with the surname ==
=== Religion ===
- Antonio de Araujo (died 1632), Brazilian Jesuit missionary
- Eugênio de Araújo Sales (1920–2012), cardinal in the Roman Catholic Church
- Serafim Fernandes de Araújo (1924–2019), cardinal archbishop of Belo Horizonte, Brazil

=== Arts and humanities ===
- Francisco Correa de Araujo (1584–1654) Spanish renaissance organist, composer, and theorist
- Emanoel Araújo (1940–2022), Brazilian artist, art curator and museologist
- Orestes Araújo (1853–1915), Uruguayan scholar
- Emanuel Araújo (1942–2000), Brazilian historian and professor
- Cândido José de Araújo Viana (1793–1875), Brazilian writer
- César Calvo de Araujo (1910–1970), Peruvian writer and painter
- Cristiano Araújo (1986–2015), Brazilian sertanejo singer and songwriter
- Juan de Araujo (1646–1712), Spanish-Peruvian Musician
- Loipa Araújo (born 1943), Cuban prima ballerina
- Manuel de Araújo Porto-alegre, Baron of Santo Ângelo (1806–1876), Brazilian poet and playwright
- Nelson de Araújo (1926–1993), Brazilian author
- Robert Araujo (1948–2015), American lawyer and professor
- Taís Araújo (born 1978), Brazilian actress
- Sonia Araujo (born 1970), Portuguese TV presenter
- Kate DeAraugo (born 1985), Australian singer
- Arturo Araujo (born 1967), Colombian artist
- Heriberto Araújo (born 1983), Spanish journalist and writer
- Mia Araujo (born 1986), Argentine-American painter

=== Celebrities ===
- Camilla Araujo (born 2002), American influencer and ex-OnlyFans creator

=== Science and technology ===
- Carlos Paz de Araújo, Brazilian-American scientist and inventor
- Antonio Lazcano (born 1950), Mexican biology researcher and professor
- Carolina Araujo (born 1976), Brazilian mathematician
- Heráclides César de Souza Araújo (1886–1962), Brazilian scientist
- António de Araújo e Azevedo, 1st Count of Barca (1754–1817), Portuguese statesman, author and amateur botanist

=== Politicians ===
- Aliança de Araújo (born c. 1951), East Timorese politician
- Álvaro Araújo Castro (born 1967), Colombian politician
- Angélica Araujo Lara (born 1964), Mexican architect and politician
- Arturo Araujo (1878–1967), president of El Salvador
- Consuelo Araújo (1940–2001), Colombian politician, writer and self-taught journalist
- Edson Coelho Araújo (born 1949), Brazilian politician
- Fernando Araújo Perdomo (born c. 1955), Minister of Development of Colombia
- Fernando de Araújo (born 1962), East Timorese politician
- Frana Araujo Mace (1934–2015), American politician
- Hernando Molina Araújo (born 1961), Colombian politician
- João Augusto de Araújo Castro (1919–1975), Brazilian diplomat and minister
- João Batista Oliveira de Araujo, Brazilian politician
- Luís Araújo (1949–2023), Chief of Staff of the Portuguese Air Force
- Manuel Enrique Araujo (1865–1913), President of El Salvador
- María Consuelo Araújo (born 1971), Colombian politician
- Mariano de Araújo Matsinhe (born 1937), Mozambican politician
- Nelson Araujo (born 1987), American politician
- Theolinda Olympio de Araújo, Brazilian politician
- José Sarney de Araújo Costa (born 1930), Brazilian President
- Joaquim Aurélio Barreto Nabuco de Araújo (1849–1910), Brazilian writer and statesman
- Pedro de Araújo Lima, Marquis of Olinda (1793–1870), politician and monarchist of the Empire of Brazil
- Manuel de Araújo (born 1970), Mozambican politician

=== Sportspeople ===
- Adriana Araújo (born 1981), Brazilian boxer
- Adriana Araújo (journalist) (born 1972), Brazilian journalist
- Gabriel Araújo (swimmer) (born 2002), Brazilian Paralympic swimmer
- George Araujo (1931–1997), American boxer
- Eronilde de Araújo (born 1970), Brazilian athlete
- Marcelo Araujo (1947–2026), Argentine sports journalist
- Márcio Araújo (volleyball) (born 1973), beach volleyball player
- Mário de Araújo Cabral (1934–2020), former racing driver
- Maurie De Araugo (1902–1966), Australian rules footballer
- Rafael Paulo de Lara Araújo (born 1980), Brazilian professional basketball player
- Rafael Araújo (born 1991), Brazilian volleyball player
- Rafael Araujo-Lopes (born 1996), American gridiron footballer
- Armindo Araujo (born 1977), Portuguese rally driver
- Pedro Araújo (born 1993), Dominican professional baseball pitcher

==== Footballers ====
- Araújo (footballer, born 1998) (Henrique Araújo de Oliveira), Brazilian footballer
- Alcides Araújo Alves (born 1985), Brazilian footballer
- Brian Araújo (born 2000), Portuguese footballer
- Carlos Luciano Araujo (born 1981), Argentinian defender
- César Araújo (born 2001), Uruguayan footballer
- Clemerson de Araújo Soares (born 1977), Brazilian footballer
- Denílson de Oliveira Araújo (born 1977), Brazilian football winger
- Edson Araújo (born 1980), Brazilian footballer
- Gustavo Lazzaretti de Araújo (born 1984), Brazilian central defender
- Henrique Araújo (born 2002), Portuguese striker
- Ilan Araujo Dall'Igna (born 1980), Brazilian football forward
- João Vitor Araújo da Silva (born 2005), Brazilian football midfielder
- Jorge Mauá (Jorge do Vale de Araujo, born 1987), Brazilian footballer
- Jorge Araújo (born 1988), Portuguese footballer
- Jorge Araujo (born 1979), Peruvian footballer
- José Carlos da Costa Araújo (born 1962), Brazilian football goalkeeper
- Joubert Araújo Martins (born 1975), Brazilian association football player
- Julián Araujo (born 2001), Mexican football player
- Leonardo Araújo (born 1969), Brazilian football midfielder
- Márcio Rodrigues Araújo (born 1984), Brazilian defensive midfielder
- Marcos Gomes de Araujo (born 1976), Brazilian striker
- Maximiliano Araújo (born 2000), Uruguayan footballer
- Néstor Araujo (born 1991), Mexican footballer
- Oélilton Araújo dos Santos (born 1981), Brazilian-born Croatian footballer
- Patricio Araujo (born 1988), Mexican footballer
- Paulo Araujo Jr. (born 1989), Brazilian striker
- Rafael Araújo (Brazilian footballer, born 1984)
- Raffael Caetano de Araújo (born 1985), footballer
- Reginaldo Araújo (born 1977), Brazilian defender
- Ricardo Martins de Araújo (born 1986), Brazilian footballer
- Ronald Araújo (born 1999), Uruguayan football defender
- Ronny Heberson Furtado de Araújo (born 1986), Brazilian football defender
- Saulo Araújo Fontes (born 1989), Brazilian goalkeeper
- Sérgio Araújo (born 1963), Brazilian winger
- Sergio Araujo (born 1992), Argentine striker
- Telmario de Araújo Sacramento (born 1983), Brazilian striker
- Thiago Luiz Moreira de Araújo (born 1988), Brazilian full back
- Tomás Araújo (born 2002), Portuguese footballer
- Vinícius Vasconcelos Araújo (born 1993), Brazilian striker

=== Victims of crime ===
- Cheryl Araujo (March 28, 1961 – December 14, 1986), assault victim from New Bedford, Massachusetts, United States
- Dorothy Alma de Araujo (1921 – September 11, 2001), victim of the September 11 attacks from Naples, California, United States
- Gwen Araujo (February 24, 1985 – October 4, 2002), transgender teenager murdered in Newark, California, United States

=== Fictional ===
- Araújo family, Portuguese Americans in the film Mystic Pizza

== Bibliography ==
- ARMORIAL LUSITANO, Editorial Enciclopédia Ltda., Lisboa, 1961, Prof. Afonso Eduardo Martins Zuquete.
