= Maua =

Maua may refer to:

== Places ==
- Maua, Cuanza Norte, town in Angola
- Mauá da Serra, municipality in Southern Brazil
- Maua, Kenya
- Mauá, São Paulo, Brazil
- Mauá (CPTM), railway station in São Paulo, Brazil
- Mauá Wall, flood wall in Brazil
- Mauá Railway, the first railway in Brazil
- Mauá Wharf, river port in Brazil
- Mauá Hydroelectric Plant, Brazil
- Praça Mauá, square in Rio de Janeiro, Brazil
- Maúa District, Niassa Province, Mozambique

== People ==
- Maua Abeid Daftari (born 1953), Tanzanian politician and parliamentarian
- Maua Sama (born 1990), Tanzanian musician
- Elma Maua (1948–2010), New Zealand journalist and editor
- Jorge Mauá (born 1987), Brazilian footballer

== Biology ==
- Catriona maua, a species of sea slug
- Maua (cicada), a genus of cicada
- Maua albigutta, a species of tree bug
- Pachycerianthus maua, a species of sea anemone
- Xylosma hawaiensis, a tree endemic to Hawaii

== Others ==
- Estaleiro Mauá, shipyard in Brazil
- Mauá FC, football club in São Paulo, Brazil
