= Mace (surname) =

Mace is a surname, and may refer to:

- Arthur Cruttenden Mace (1874–1928), British Egyptologist
- Aurelia Mace (1835-1910), American Shaker eldress, thinker, and writer
- Borden Mace (1920–2014), American film producer
- Cecil Alec Mace (1894–1971), British philosopher and industrial psychologist
- Dan Mace (1834–1885), American harness racing jockey and horse trainer
- Daniel Mace (politician) (1811–1867), U.S. Representative from Indiana
- Daniel Mace (biblical scholar), English textual critic of the New Testament
- Eduardo Mace (born 1966), Anglo-Brazilian businessman, pioneer of multimedia software
- Flora Mace (born 1949), American glass artist
- Frances Laughton Mace (1836–1899), American poet
- Frana Araujo Mace (1934–2015), American politician
- Fred Mace (1878–1917), American silent era actor
- Fred Mace (1895–1938), English professional footballer
- Dame Georgina Mace (1953–2020), British ecologist and conservation scientist
- James Mace (1952–2004), American historian
- Jem Mace (1831–1910), English bare-knuckle boxing champion
- Joe Mace (born 1971), British television producer and presenter
- Joel Mace, American politician
- Myles Mace (1911–2000), Harvard Business School professor
- Nancy Mace (born 1977), U.S. Representative from South Carolina
- Zoe Mace, English singer

== See also ==
- Macé (surname)
