= Italo Scanga =

Italian-born American visual artist, educator (1932–2001)

- Born: June 6, 1932; Lago, Calabria, Kingdom of Italy (now Italy)
- Died: July 27, 2001 (aged 69); Pacific Beach, San Diego, California, United States
- Education: Michigan State University (BA, MFA)
- Occupations: Visual artist, educator
- Known for: Sculpture, ceramics, glass, printmaking, painting
- Notable work: Saint Joseph (1976)
- Movement: Neo-Dadaist, Neo-Expressionist, Neo-Cubist
- Spouse(s): Mary Louise Ashley (m. 1956–), Stephanie Smedley
- Partner: Su-mei Yu
- Children: 5
- Website: www.italoscanga.org

Italo Scanga (June 6, 1932 – July 27, 2001), an Italian-born American visual artist and educator. He was known for his sculptures, ceramics, glass, prints, and paintings, working as a neo-Dadaist, neo-Expressionist, and neo-Cubist; his art was mostly created from found objects and/or ordinary objects. Scanga taught for many years at the University of California, San Diego (UCSD).

== Early life and education ==
Italo Scanga was born on June 6, 1932, in Lago in Calabria, Kingdom of Italy (now Italy). In 1946, his family immigrated to the United States, when he was age 14. After graduation from Garden City High School, Scanga worked on the assembly line of General Motors factory.

Scanga served in the United States Army from 1953 to 1955 in Austria, within the armored tank division. In 1956, Scanga married librarian Mary Louise Ashley, whom he had five children with.

In 1960, Scanga graduated with a B.A. degree from Michigan State University. His classmates in college included Richard Merkin, and David Pease, who remained friends throughout his life. He studied under Lindsey Decker and Charles Pollock; Decker introduced Scanga to welding and sculpture. He received a M.F.A. degree from Michigan State University in 1961.

== Career ==
Scanga taught fine art at the University of Wisconsin–Madison, the Rhode Island School of Design, the Tyler School of Art at Temple University, and at the University of California, San Diego. He also taught at the Pilchuck Glass School.

In 1972, he had a solo exhibition at the Whitney Museum of American Art, in New York City.

== Artwork ==
Scanga's materials included natural objects like branches and seashells, as well as kitsch figurines, castoff musical instruments and decorative trinkets salvaged from flea markets and thrift shops. He combined these ingredients into free-standing assemblages, which he then painted. Although visually ebullient, the results sometimes referred to gruesome episodes from Greek mythology or the lives and deaths of martyred saints.

He considered his artistic influences to be sweepingly pan-cultural, from African sculpture to Giorgio de Chirico. He often collaborated with his close friend, the glass sculptor Dale Chihuly.

Myths had always fascinated Italo Scanga. Many of his sculptures translate written or oral narratives into the realm of visual objects. Constructed of wood and glass, found objects or fabric, his ensembles reflect a trio of activities—working, eating, and praying. These activities dominate the lives of those who live close to the land, but they are also activities that are idealized by many who contemplate, romantically, a simpler, bucolic life.

Scanga — through a vocabulary of basic tools, icons, and foodstuffs, reworked — attempts to restore the original sense of the peasant world: the realities of hard work or religious devotion.

While there is no single source for Scanga's work, many of the stories, traditions, and superstitions retold in his works are native to the folk-life of southern Italy. The culture from the Calabrian countryside of Scanga's native land provides the artist with his most consistent source material.

Whether religious or secular in content, Scanga's works of the past decade are the artist's reflections on the immutable, universal aspects of peasant life. Some, like the series of Italian photographs, are intensely personal, while others use a more generally recognized set of images—old farm tools, wooden bowls or large plaster statues of Saint Joseph and the Madonna. They are all, however, Scanga's own reinterpretation of those universals, his personal memories and thoughts commingled and then frozen for his audience to contemplate.

=== Potato Famine sculpture series ===
Scanga's series of works, the "Potato Famine" sculptures, are logical extensions of his earlier efforts. He begins with the familiars of saints and tools, but here they are supporting armatures not focal points. If his earlier offerings of herbs, peppers, and the like were presented in blown glass peasant ware or hung as dried provisions domesticating an exhibition space, these potato supplications are affixed directly to the accompanying icons—not unlike the devotions pinned directly to the images of saints and Madonnas as they are paraded before the faithful in street processions. Other spuds rest in huge ladles and bowls just as they are—a simple, raw food—uncooked but potentially nourishing.

Scanga's choice of the white (sometimes called Irish) potato is a metaphor for the meager existence of the rural working class at the time.

Employing real potatoes enables Scanga to extend such parallels even further. His spuds eventually sprout greenery and if left in place long enough return in a desiccated state to an earth-like dust, reflecting the natural cycles of birth, life, death, and rebirth.

The politics that concern Scanga here are not specific to Italy, in fact this particular source of inspiration is derived from a different peasant culture, the rural class of Ireland. Soon after his move to the West Coast in 1978, Scanga read detailed information on the infamous Irish Potato Famines of the late 1840s. As he almost always does, he began to research this sociopolitical tragedy and quickly realized the enormity of the facts and figures. Close to one million Irish dead, over a million emigrated caused by successive failures of the staple food crop the white potato. Waves of economic and social upheaval raced through the poor rural class as did epidemics of cholera, typhus, dysentery and scurvy. The population of a nation was decimated in a few decades from 7 million to well under 3 million.

Scanga's research revealed that it was not simply the blight and natural forces that caused so enormous a loss, but the presence in Ireland of a domineering political force—Great Britain. The failure of Great Britain to aid the Irish during the crucial years of 1846 through the 1850s, the almost inhuman absence of aid for a country that was almost totally dependent on the British, was the injustice that moved Scanga to create his sculptures.

Scanga attempts to reinvigorate this century-old conflict and restore some of the feelings lost today. These events have been embroidered by myth, homogenized by history. Scanga's work is anti-historical, as he tries to undo what the selectivity of history made palatable. Scanga searches for not just facts and figures but sensibility.

Scanga's newest works encompass both contemplation and action. These two polarities—thinking and doing—are part of the political process as well.

== Death and legacy ==
Scanga died of heart failure at age 69 on July 27, 2001, at his Turquoise Street studio in Pacific Beach in San Diego, California. He was survived by his five children. The Italo Scanga Foundation was established in 2001.

== Collections ==
His work is in numerous museum collections, including at the Museum of Modern Art in New York City; the Brooklyn Museum; the Museum of Northwest Art in La Conner, Washington; the Metropolitan Museum of Art in New York City; the Detroit Institute of Arts; the Art Institute of Chicago; the Rhode Island School of Design Museum; among others.

== Timeline ==
=== Childhood ===
- 1932: Born in Lago, Calabria, to Giuseppe and Serafina Ziccarelli, the youngest of four children, the others being Carolina, Mafalda and Nicolino.
- 1939-1945: Prepares to leave with his mother for America to meet his father and brother. American troops invade Italy on the day of departure and they are unable to leave. Spends the war years in Lago with his mother and very few resources. Works as a cabinetmaker's apprentice and studies sculpture with a man who carves statues of saints.

=== Immigration, family and education ===
- 1947: Emigrates to America with his mother, to Point Marion, Pennsylvania, where his father works as a laborer for the railroad.
- 1950: Moves to Garden City, Michigan, with his family and works at General Motors lifting transmissions on an assembly line.
- 1951-1953: Studies at the Society of Arts and Crafts in Detroit, MI.
- 1953: Due to his language barrier, graduates from Garden City High School at the age of 21 while continuing to work evenings at General Motors.
- 1956: Marries Mary Louise Ashley, a librarian at the Garden City Public Library. Moves to East Lansing, MI where he enrolls at Michigan State University.
- 1956: First son, Italo Antonio Amadeo (Tony) born.
- 1958: Father, Giuseppe dies in Garden City, MI.
- 1959: Daughter, Katherine Elizabeth (Cici) born. Look Magazine commissions him to do a photographic "human story" about his mother, a widow immigrant, returning with her to Calabria (where she remains until the end of her life). Publishes a book of these photographs in 1979.
- 1961: First teaching job at University of Wisconsin (through 1964). Meets Harvey Littleton, a fellow instructor. Lives in faculty housing.
- 1962: Daughter Serafina Annaliese (Sarah) born.
- 1963: Son Giuseppe Edward (Joe) born.
- 1969: Son William Frankel (Bill) born.

=== Teaching ===
- 1964: Moves to Providence, Rhode Island, to teach at Rhode Island School of Design (RISD). Is colleagues with artists Richard Merkin and Hardu Keck. Starts a correspondence with HC Westermann. Spends summers teaching at Brown University; colleague of Hugh Townley.
- 1966: Moves to State College, PA, and teaches at Pennsylvania State University for one year. Meets artists Juris Ubans, Harry Anderson, Richard Frankel, and Richard Calabro, who remain friends throughout his career.
- 1967: David Pease helps him get a tenure track position at Tyler School of Art in Philadelphia, PA, and the family moves to Glenside, PA. Artists he works closely with include Ernest Silva, Lee Jaffe, Donald Gill, and William Schwedler. Meets graduate student Dale Chihuly while lecturing at RISD and develops a lifelong friendship.
- 1978: Moves to La Jolla California to teach at University of California, San Diego. Ree Morton was teaching there at the time and recommended Italo as a faculty.

=== Exhibitions 1970's ===
- 1969: One person exhibition, Baylor Art Gallery, Baylor University, Waco, TX. Buys his first home in Glenside, PA, at 2225 Menlo Avenue. Works in his basement studio, creates installations with farm implements, herbs, glass containers and saint iconography. Works very closely with students Larry Becker and Heidi Nivling (who later run a gallery in Philadelphia, PA), and Harry Anderson. Welcomes many artists into his home including Donald Judd, Dan Flavin, Bruce Nauman (a former student), Vito Acconci, Ree Morton and Rafael Ferrer.
- 1970: Exhibits "Saints, Glass, Tools, and Romances" at Atelier Chapman Kelly, Dallas, TX, one of his first one-person installations. Included in the sculpture annual at the Whitney Museum of American Art, NYC. Receives Howard Foundation grant from Brown University.
- 1971: Collaborates with Dale Chihuly and Jamie Carpenter pouring molten glass into bamboo at RISD. Exhibits the work at Museum of Art, Vassar College, Poughkeepsie, NY. Teaches summer school at University of Rhode Island, Kingston, RI (through 1973) and has a show, "Christ & Pythagoras." Shows an installation at Henri Gallery, Washington, DC.
- 1972: Installations at the Clocktower, NYC, and Virginia Commonwealth University, Richmond, VA. Teaches in Rome, Italy. for Tyler School of Art.
- 1973: "Saints Glass" at 112 Greene Street Gallery, NYC. Installation at the Institute of Contemporary Art at University of Pennsylvania, Philadelphia, PA. Meets Gordon Matta Clark and contributes to an artist cookbook. Goes to Pilchuck Glass School, Stanwood, WA, founded by Dale Chihuly, as a visiting artist. He continues to work there annually through 2001. Works over the years with Pilchuck artists Richard Royal, Seaver Leslie, Jamie Carpenter, Joey Kirkpatrick, Flora Mace, Robbie Miller, Billy Morris, Buster Simpson, Toots Zynsky, Howard Ben Tré, and Therman Statom. Separates from his wife Mary and leaves Glenside, PA to live in Philadelphia at 1359 71st Ave. Receives an NEA grant.

=== California ===
- 1976: Moves to La Jolla, CA to take a one-year job teaching at the University of California, San Diego as a visiting professor. Hired by David and Eleanor Antin at the suggestion of Ree Morton.
- 1977: Moves back to Philadelphia, PA, and returns to Tyler School of Art. Exhibits "Saints, Lamentations, Limitations" at Alessandro Gallery.
- 1978: Moves permanently to La Jolla to teach at UCSD with Newton and Helen Harrison, David and Eleanor Antin, Manny Farber, Patricia Patterson, and Alan Kaprow. The University supplies him with his first real studio in an old water tank on campus. Creates "Fear" series while visiting Dale Chihuly that summer in Providence, RI. Begins the first of several trips to Italy to make pilgrimages, to visit his family, and to look at art and architecture.
- 1987: Meets Pasquale Verdicchio, writer and professor in UCSD's Department of Literature, with whom he begins a number of collaborations: including a series on Giambattista Vico, entitled Tropes, Monsters, and Poetic Aberrations; and another on Tommaso Campanella's City of the Sun.

=== Exhibitions 1979–2001 ===
- 1979: Creates the "Potato Famine" series, his first work at UCSD. Exhibits them at the Boehm Gallery, Palomar College, San Marcos, CA and at Gallery One, San Jose State University, San Jose, CA. Meets art dealer Barry Rosen.
- 1980: Exhibits "Fear" and "Potato Famine" pieces at the Frank Kolbert Gallery, NYC. Receives NEA grant.
- 1981: Two week residency at Crown Point Press, San Francisco, CA. Long time friend Dale Chihuly calls asking what the Italian word for "spots" is, after creating a design using all the available colors in the hot shop. The Dale Chihuly "Macchia" series was named by Italo Scanga, only after Dale Chihuly's mother Viola Chihuly called the series of glass the "Uglies".
- 1982: Exhibits at Charles Cowles Gallery, NYC. Creates woodcuts with Chip Elwell. After 9 years of separation, he and Mary Louise Ashley divorce.
- 1983: Included in the Whitney Biennial, Whitney Museum of American Art, NYC. Exhibits "Archimedes Troubles: Sculptures and Drawings" at the La Jolla Museum of Contemporary Art, "Italo Scanga Heads" at the Los Angeles County Museum of Art, and "Italo Scanga: Sculptures" as titled at the Delahunty Gallery, NYC. "Animal in Danger" and "Montecassino" series made. Working with studio assistants Ryk Williams and Dan Britton. Marries Stephanie Smedley.
- 1984: Constructs "Figure Holding Fire", with his son Joe, at Santa Barbara Museo, Mammola, Italy, his first public commission. Joe and he continue doing the public commissions together through the years. Included in "Primitivism in 20th Century Art" at the Museum of Modern Art, NYC. Has his first one-person show in Florida at the Bruce Helander Gallery.
- 1985: "Italo Scanga New Works" at Arte Contemporaneo, Mexico City, Mexico. Travels to Leggia, Switzerland and creates work for dealer Reto a Marca, with assistant Chuck Collings. Toru Nakatani begins working with him at UCSD, and continues this working relationship for the remainder of his life. Begins the "Metaphysical" series with Ryk Williams in the water tank, UCSD.
- 1986: His first retrospective, "Italo Scanga: Recent Sculpture and Drawings" at the Oakland Museum, Oakland, CA. Shows at John Berggruen Gallery, San Francisco, CA; the Fabric Workshop, Philadelphia, PA; and Bette Stoler, NYC.
- 1987: Exhibits "Troubled World" series at Amalfi Arte, Amalfi, Italy.
- 1988: Exhibits at Peggy Guggenheim Collection, Venice, Italy; Anders Tornberg Gallery, Lund, Sweden; Dorothy Goldeen Gallery, Santa Monica, CA; Larry Becker Gallery, Philadelphia, PA; and Germans Van Eck Gallery, NYC. Commission for the City of San Jose, CA, "Figure Holding the Sun." Purchases 961 Turquoise Street studio, San Diego, CA.
- 1989: Amalfi Arte publishes "Italo Scanga" with an essay by Michele Buonomo. Separates from Stephanie Smedley and moves into Turquoise Street studio. Receives Distinguished Alumni Award from Michigan State University.
- 1990: Exhibits at Betsy Rosenfield Gallery in Chicago, IL. Artist in Residence at Skowhegan School of Painting and Sculpture, Skowhegan, ME. Builds sculptures with son, Bill. Divorces Stephanie Smedley. Starts spending a majority of his time working on paintings.
- 1991: Travels to Vietri Sul Mare, Italy, with son Bill, to work at Deruta ceramics factory. Meets welder David Grindle and initiates a series of metal sculptures with glass, trees, & cones, and several large welded "Trees" at Turquoise Studio.
- 1992: Exhibits in solo shows at the Athenaeum Music and Arts Library, La Jolla, CA, and the Susanne Hillberry Gallery, Birmingham, MI. Meets David and Leisa Austin, and becomes a featured artist at Imago Galleries, Palm Desert, CA. Meets Su-Mei Yu, a chef and restaurateur, his companion through the end of his life.
- 1993: Has one person shows at the Tacoma Art Museum, Tacoma, WA and the Fay Gold Gallery, Atlanta, GA.
- 1994: Meets Nando Randi, visiting from Ravenna for the America's Cup. Over the next years establishes friendships with many Italians visiting San Diego and living in Italy, including Chiara Fuschini, Felice Nittolo, Diego Esposito, Ubaldo Grazia, and Giuseppe Padula.
- 1995: Exhibition at Galleria Il Patio, Ravenna, Italy. Travels to Deruta, Italy, with son Bill, and works at Deruta ceramic factory; also in 1996, 1997, and 1999. Travels to Thailand with Su-Mei Yu. Receives Chancellor's Award, University of California, San Diego.
- 1996: Exhibition at Barry Rosen & Jaap van Lier Modern & Contemporary Art, NYC.
- 1997: Exhibitions at Bayley Art Museum, Charlottesville, VA; Bryan Ohno Gallery, Seattle, WA; and Comune di Ravenna, Ravenna, Italy. Artist-in-residence for two weeks at University of Virginia, Charlottesville, VA. Makes frescoes with Megan Marlatt.
- 1998: Exhibits at Grossmont College Hyde Gallery, San Diego, CA and Cuesta College Art Gallery, San Luis Obispo, CA
- 1999: Shows at Flanders Contemporary Art, Minneapolis, MN. and The Lillian Berkley Collection, Escondido, CA. Purchases a second studio at 4130 Napier Street, San Diego, CA.
- 2000: Exhibition at Larry Becker Gallery, Philadelphia, PA. Begins work on an exciting new series of work, after several years of primarily painting, called the "Candlestick" series with Mike Patterson and Neal Bociek.
- 2001: Major commission, "Continents", at San Diego International Airport. Ready to travel to Italy for several months for scheduled exhibitions in Lago, Calabria and Ravenna, Italy. Also working on creating a museum of his work in his hometown of Lago, Calabria and preparing for an exhibition in San Diego, at the FLUX Gallery, with John Drury and Robbie Miller (CUD). The three artists met at the Pilchuck Glass School, and the collaborative team of Drury and Miller, consider Scanga a mentor.
