= Bartolomeu de Leão =

Brazilian missionary (circa 1641 – 1715)

- Born: c. 1641; Rio de Janeiro
- Died: 8 March 1715 (aged 73–74); Rio de Janeiro
- Occupation: Jesuit missionary
- Years active: 1658–1715
- Notable work: Catechism in the Brasílica Language

Bartolomeu de Leão (c. 1641 – 8 March 1715) was a Brazilian missionary and teacher.

== Biography ==
Born around 1641 in Rio de Janeiro, Bartolomeu de Leão joined the Society of Jesus at the age of 17 on 9 July 1658. In 1663, he taught humanities at the Colégio de Santos and became its rector in 1677. That same year, on 15 August, Leão made his solemn profession there. He worked with the Indians and was "remarkably skilled" in their language, revising the second edition of the Catechism in the Brasílica Language. Leão died on 8 March 1715, in Rio de Janeiro.

== See also ==
- Antônio de Araújo

== Bibliography ==
- Leite, Serafim (1949). História da Companhia de Jesus no Brasil [History of the Company of Jesus in Brazil] (in Portuguese). Vol. VIII. Rio de Janeiro: Instituto Nacional do Livro.
