= Legal status of the Holy See =

Legal status of the Catholic Church in its international relations

The legal status of the Holy See, the ecclesiastical jurisdiction of the Catholic Church in Rome, both in state practice and according to the writing of modern legal scholars, is that of a full subject of public international law, with rights and duties analogous to those of states.

== A sui generis entity possessing international personality ==
Although the Holy See, as distinct from the Vatican City State, does not fulfill the long-established criteria in international law of statehood; i.e. having a permanent population, a defined territory, a stable government and the capacity to enter into relations with other states; its possession of full legal personality in international law is evidenced by its diplomatic relations with 180 states, that it is a member-state in various intergovernmental international organizations, and that it is: "respected by the international community of sovereign States and treated as a subject of international law having the capacity to engage in diplomatic relations and to enter into binding agreements with one, several, or many states under international law that are largely geared to establish and preserving peace in the world." As Graham notes:

The fact that the Holy See is a non-territorial institution is no longer regarded as a reason for denying it international personality. The papacy can act in its own name in the international community. It can enter into legally binding conventions known as concordats. In the world of diplomacy the Pope enjoys the rights of active and passive legation. (...) Furthermore, this personality of the Holy See is distinct from the personality of the State of Vatican City. One is a non-territorial institution and the other a state. The papacy as a religious organ is a subject of international law and capable of international rights and duties.

This peculiar character of the Holy See in international law, as a non-territorial entity with a legal personality akin to that of states, has led Prof. Ian Brownlie to define it as a "sui generis entity". Prof. Maurice Mendelson (then lecturer) argued that "[i]n two respects it may be doubted whether the territorial entity, the Vatican City, meets the traditional criteria of statehood" and that "[t]he special status of the Vatican City is probably best regarded as a means of ensuring that the Pope can freely exercise his spiritual functions, and in this respect is loosely analogous to that of the headquarters of international organisations."

== Self-perception of the Holy See ==
Moreover, the Holy See itself, while claiming international legal personality, does not claim to be a State. Cardinal Jean-Louis Tauran, former Secretary for Relations with States of the Secretariat of State of the Holy See, has underlined the need to avoid assimilating the Holy See and its international action with that of a State, with their thirst for power. According to Tauran, the Holy See is unquestionably a sovereign subject of international law but of a predominantly religious nature.

== The legal basis of the Holy See's international personality ==
For some experts, the current legal personality of the Holy See is a remnant of its preeminent role in medieval politics. Thus Arangio-Ruiz noted that the Holy See has been an actor in the evolution of international law since before the creation of strong nation states, and that it has maintained international personality since.

For others, the international personality of the Holy See arises solely from its recognition by other states. In this sense, Brownlie argues that the personality of the Holy See "as a religious organ apart from its territorial base in the Vatican City" arises from the "principle of effectiveness", that is, from the fact that other states voluntarily recognize the Holy See, acquiesce having bilateral relations with it, and in fact do so, in a situation where no rule of ius cogens is breached. For him, though, the international personality thus conferred is effective only towards those states prepared to enter into diplomatic relations with it. Crawford similarly believes that the recognition of a number of states is important evidence to acknowledge the legal personality of the Holy See, so that, today, it cannot be denied.

For a third group of authors, the international legal personality of the Holy See is based mostly, but not only, on its unique spiritual role. Araujo notes, for instance, that "it is generally understood that the Holy See's international personality emerges from its religious, moral and spiritual authority and mission in the world as opposed to a claim over purely temporal matters. This is an incomplete understanding, however, of the grounds on which its claim as a subject of international law can be justified", since, in his view, the Holy See's claim to international personality can also be justified by the fact that it is recognized by other states as a full subject of international law. The Lateran Treaty itself seems to support this view. In article 2, Italy recognized "the sovereignty of the Holy See in the international domain as an attribute inherent in its nature, in accordance with its tradition and with the requirements of its mission in the world."

For a further group, the legal personality of the Holy See in international law arises from the Lateran Treaty, which, in their view, conferred international standing to the central government of the Catholic Church. In this sense, Oppenheim argued that "the previously controversial international position of the Holy See was clarified as the result of the Treaty of 11 February 1929, between the Holy See and Italy - the so called Lateran Treaty. (...) The Lateran Treaty marks the resumption of the formal membership, interrupted in 1871, of the Holy See in the society of states."

Oppenheim goes further and denies a separate legal personality for the Vatican City State. For him, the composite of the Holy See plus the Vatican City constitutes just one international person;

The strict view ought probably to be that the Lateran Treaty created a new international state of the Vatican City, with the incumbent of the Holy See as its Head; but the practice of states does not always sharply distinguishes between the two elements in that way. Nevertheless it is accepted that in one form or the other there exists a state possessing the formal requirements of statehood and constituting an international person recognized as such by other states.

Kunz sharply criticized this view. For him:

The Lateran Treaty had the object of liquidating once for all the 'Roman Question' and bringing about a reconciliation between the Holy See and Italy, but in no way created or changed the international position of the Holy See. (It is therefore not correct, as Oppenheim (...) states that "the hitherto controversial international position of the Holy See was clarified as a result of the Treaty.") The treaty concluded between the Holy See and Italy pre-supposes the international personality of the Holy See.

== Status between 1870 and 1929 ==
A separate question is whether the Holy See was a subject of international law between 1870, when the Kingdom of Italy annexed the Papal States, and 1929, when the Lateran Treaties were signed. The United States, for instance, suspended diplomatic relations with the Holy See when it lost the Papal States. Similarly, Oppenheim believed that the legal personality of the Papal States became extinct in 1870. For him, between 1870 and 1929, the "Holy See was not an international person," although "it had by custom and tacit consent of most states acquired a quasi-international position". The United Nations International Law Commission noted, nonetheless, that:

It has always been a principle of international law that entities other than States might possess international personality and treaty-making capacity. An example is afforded by the Papacy particularly in the period immediately preceding the Lateran Treaty of 1929, when the Papacy exercised no territorial sovereignty. The Holy See was nevertheless regarded as possessing international treaty-making capacity. Even now, although there is a Vatican State (...) treaties are entered into not by reason of territorial sovereignty over the Vatican State, but on behalf of the Holy See, which exists separately from that State.

Similarly, Kunz argued that:

Prior to 1870, there were two subjects of international law: the Papal State and the Holy See. (...) Of these two persons in international law the one, the Papal State, undoubtedly came to an end, under the rules of general international law, by the Italian conquest and subjugation in 1870. But the Holy See remained, as always, a subject of general international law also in the period between 1870 and 1929. That this is so, is fully proved by the practice of states. The Holy See continued to conclude concordats and continued, with the consent of a majority of states, to exercise the active and passive right of legation. The legal position of its diplomatic agents (...) remained based on general international law, not on the Italian Law of Guarantee, a municipal law.

== Opposition to the Holy See's participation in multilateral forums ==
Since 1995, the non-governmental organization Catholics for Choice has advocated against the participation of the Holy See in multilateral forums. It argues that the Holy See is a religious organization and not a state, and that, therefore, it should have neither a special status in international law nor the right to participate, in a position analogous to that of states, in the international conferences on social, cultural and economic matters. No state has supported this initiative. On the contrary, the United Nations General Assembly confirmed and raised further the status of the Holy See as an observer within the UN, through its Resolution 58/314 of 16 July 2004.

== See also ==
- Holy See and the United Nations
- Foreign relations of the Holy See
- Multilateral foreign policy of the Holy See
- Index of Vatican City-related articles

== Bibliography ==
- Abdullah, Yasmin, "Note, The Holy See at United Nations Conferences: State or Church?" 96 Columbia Law Review 1835 (1996)
- Acquaviva, Guido, "Subjects of International Law: A Power-Based Analysis," 38 Vanderbilt Journal of Transnational Law (2005)
- Arangio-Ruiz, Gaetano, "On the Nature of the International Personality of the Holy See," 29 Revue Belge de Droit International (1996)
- Araujo, Robert and Lucal, John, Papal Diplomacy and the Quest for Peace, the Vatican and International Organizations from the early years to the League of Nations, Sapienza Press (2004)
- Araujo, Robert John, "The International Personality and Sovereignty of the Holy See," 50 Catholic University Law Review 291 (2001)
- Bathon, Matthew N., Note, "The Atypical Status of the Holy See" 34 Vanderbilt Journal of Transnational Law 597 (2001)
- Ciprotti, Pio, "The Holy See: Its Function, Form, and Status in International Law," 8 Concilium 63 (1970)
- Crawford, James, The Creation of States in International Law, Oxford, (1979)
- Cumbo, Horace F., "The Holy See and International Law," 2 International Law Quarterly 603 (1949)
- Dias, Noel, "Roman Catholic Church and International Law," 13 Sri Lanka Law Journal 107 (2001)
- Graham, Robert, Vatican Diplomacy: A Study of Church and State on the International Plane (1959)
- Ireland, Gordon, "The State of the City of the Vatican," 27 American Journal of International Law 271 (1933).
- Kunz, Josef L., "The Status of the Holy See in International Law," 46 American Journal of International Law 308 (1952)
- Martens, Kurt. "The Position of the Holy See and Vatican City State in International Relations". University of Detroit Mercy Law Review. 83 (5).
- Morss, John R. (2015). "The International Legal Status of the Vatican/Holy See Complex". European Journal of International Law. 26 (4): 927. doi:10.1093/ejil/chv062. hdl:10536/DRO/DU:30081648.
- Shine, Cormac (2018). "Papal Diplomacy by Proxy? Catholic Internationalism at the League of Nations' International Committee on Intellectual Cooperation". The Journal of Ecclesiastical History. 69 (4): 785–805. doi:10.1017/S0022046917002731.
- Wright, Herbert, "The Status of the Vatican City," 38 American Journal of International Law 452 (1944)
