= Hokkaido Obihiro Museum of Art =

- 北海道立帯広美術館
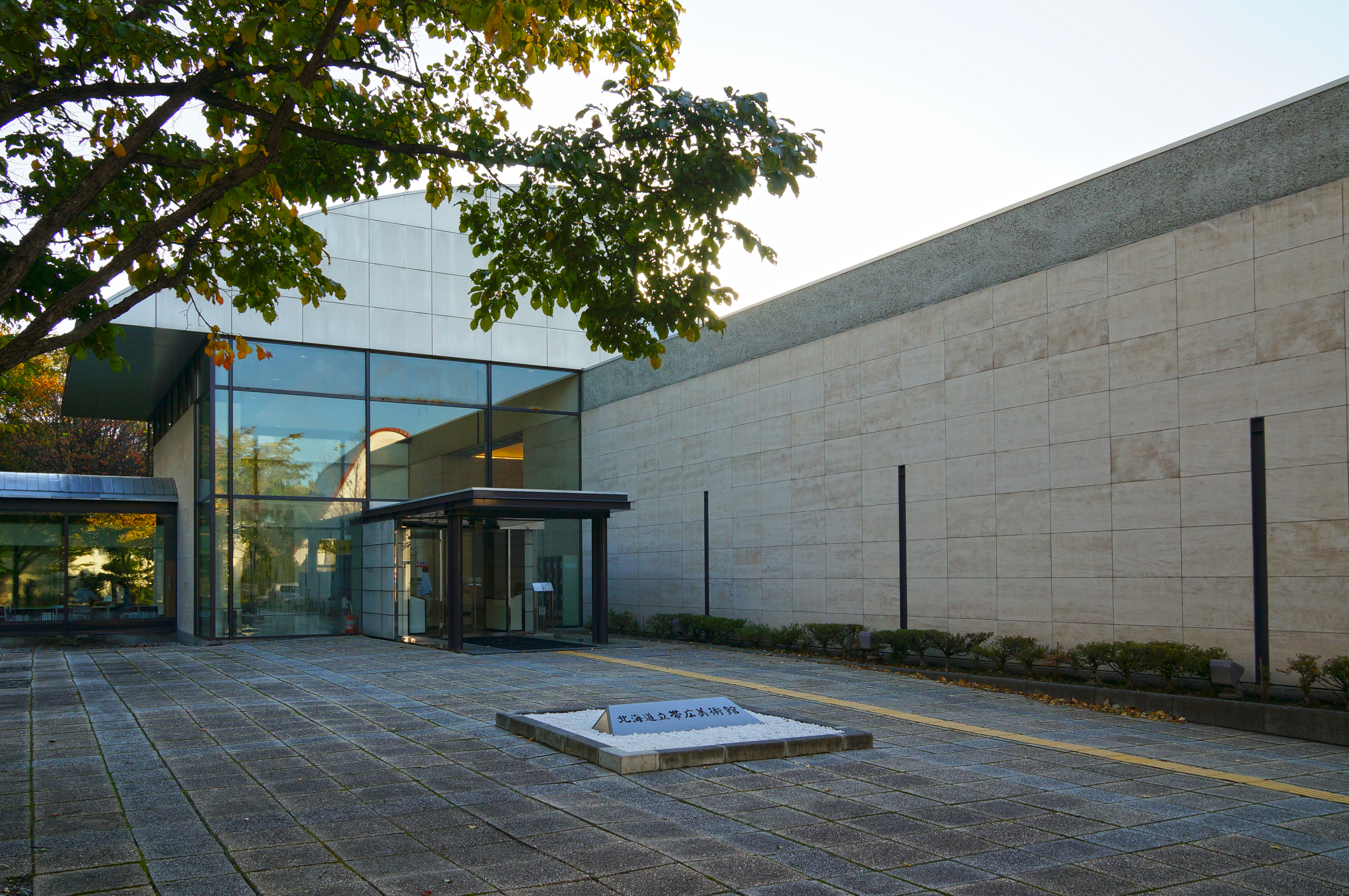

General information
- Location: 2 Midorigaoka, Obihiro, Hokkaidō, Japan
- Coordinates: 42°54′17″N 143°11′08″E
- Opened: September 1991

Website
- artmuseum.pref.hokkaido.lg.jp/obj

Hokkaido Obihiro Museum of Art (北海道立帯広美術館, Hokkaidō-ritsu Obihiro Bijutsukan) opened in Midorigaoka Park, Obihiro, Hokkaidō, Japan in 1991 as the fifth annex of Hokkaido Museum of Modern Art. The collection focuses on works by artists from eastern Hokkaidō as well as those of the Barbizon school. The museum's print holdings include work by the Hokkaido poster artist Kenichi Kuriyagawa, alongside European printmakers such as Alphonse Mucha, Henri de Toulouse-Lautrec, and Cassandre.

== See also ==
- List of Cultural Properties of Japan - paintings (Hokkaidō)
- List of Historic Sites of Japan (Hokkaidō)
- Obihiro Centennial City Museum
