= List of parties to weapons of mass destruction treaties =

The list of parties to weapons of mass destruction treaties encompasses the states which have signed and ratified, succeeded, or acceded to any of the major multilateral treaties prohibiting or restricting weapons of mass destruction (WMD), in particular nuclear, biological, or chemical weapons.

== Overview ==
Treaty	Year of entry into force	Number of States parties	Number of signatory states (signed but not ratified)	Objective
Geneva Protocol	1928	146	0	Ban the use of biological and chemical weapons
Biological Weapons Convention (parties)	1975	187	4	Comprehensively ban biological weapons
Chemical Weapons Convention (parties)	1997	193	1	Comprehensively ban chemical weapons
Partial Nuclear Test Ban Treaty (parties)	1963	126	10	Ban all nuclear weapons tests except for those conducted underground
Nuclear Non-Proliferation Treaty (parties)	1970	191	0	1. prevent nuclear proliferation; 2. promote nuclear disarmament; 3. promote peaceful uses of nuclear energy
Treaty on the Prohibition of Nuclear Weapons (parties)	2021	73	25	Comprehensively ban nuclear weapons
Comprehensive Nuclear-Test-Ban Treaty (parties)	not in force	178	9	Ban all nuclear weapons tests

== List of states parties to weapons of mass destruction treaties ==
The following list was last updated in March 2021.

Legend:

- GP = Geneva Protocol
- BWC = Biological Weapons Convention
- CWC = Chemical Weapons Convention
- NPT = Nuclear Non-Proliferation Treaty
- TPNW = Treaty on the Prohibition of Nuclear Weapons
- CTBT = Comprehensive Nuclear-Test-Ban Treaty
- S = signing; R = ratification; A = accession; Su = succession; Ac = acceptance

State party	GP	BWC	CWC	Nuclear		
State party	GP	BWC	CWC	NPT	TPNW	CTBT
Afghanistan	A	R	R	R		R
Albania	A	A	R	A		R
Algeria	A	A	R	A	S	R
Andorra		A	A	A		R
Angola	A	A	A	A	S	R
Antigua and Barbuda	Su	A	A	Su	R	R
Argentina	A	R	R	A		R
Armenia	A	A	R	A		R
Australia	A	R	R	R		R
Austria	R	R	R	R	R	R
Azerbaijan		A	R	A		R
Bahamas, The		A	R	Su		R
Bahrain	A	A	R	A		R
Bangladesh	A	A	R	A	R	R
Barbados	Su	R	A	R		R
Belarus		R	R	A		R
Belgium	R	R	R	R		R
Belize		Su/A	A	Su	R	R
Benin	A	R	R	R	R	R
Bhutan	A	A	R	A		
Bolivia	A	R	R	R	R	R
Bosnia and Herzegovina		Su	R	Su		R
Botswana		R	A	R	R	R
Brazil	R	R	R	A	S	R
Brunei		A	R	A	S	R
Bulgaria	R	R	R	R	R	R
Burkina Faso	A	A	R	R		R
Burundi		R	R	A		R
Cape Verde	A	A	R	A	R	R
Cambodia	A	R	R	A	R	R
Cameroon	A	A	R	R		R
Canada	R	R	R	R		R
Central African Republic	A	R	R	A	S	R
Chad			R	R		R
Chile	R	R	R	A	S	R
China	Su	A	R	A		S
Colombia	A	R	R	R	S	R
Comoros			R	A	R	R
Congo, Democratic Republic of the		A	R	R	S	R
Congo, Republic of the		R	R	R	S	R
Cook Islands		A	R	(Note: The Cook Islands and Niue, two associated states of New Zealand which have had their "full treaty-making capacity" recognised by United Nations Secretariat, are not parties to the treaty but consider themselves bound by its provisions by virtue of their administration by New Zealand when the latter ratified the NPT.)	A	R
Costa Rica	A	R	R	R	R	R
Côte d'Ivoire	A	R	R	R	S	R
Croatia	A	Su	R	Su		R
Cuba	A	R	R	A	R	R
Cyprus	Su	R	R	R		R
Czech Republic	Su	Su	R	Su		R
Denmark	R	R	R	R		R
Djibouti			R	A		R
Dominica		Su	R	Su	R	
Dominican Republic	A	R	R	R	S	R
East Timor		A	A	A	S	S
Ecuador	A	R	R	R	R	R
Egypt	R	S		R		S
El Salvador	R	R	R	R	R	R
Equatorial Guinea	A	A	R	A		S
Eritrea			A	A		R
Estonia	R	A	R	A		R
Eswatini	A	A	R	R		R
Ethiopia	R	R	R	R		R
Fiji	Su	R	R	A/Su	R	R
Finland	R	R	R	R		R
France	R	A	R	A		R
Gabon		R	R	A		R
Gambia, The	Su	R	R	R	R	S
Georgia		A	R	A		R
Germany	R	R	R	R		R
Ghana	A	R	R	R	S	R
Greece	R	R	R	R		R
Grenada	Su	A	R	Su	S	R
Guatemala	A	R	R	R	S	R
Guinea		A	R	A		R
Guinea-Bissau	A	A	R	A	S	R
Guyana		R	R	A	R	R
Haiti		S	R	R		R
Honduras		R	R	R	R	R
Hungary	A	R	R	R		R
Iceland	A	R	R	R		R
India	R	R	R			
Indonesia	Su	R	R	R	S	R
Iran	A	R	R	R		S
Iraq	A	R	A	R		R
Ireland	A	R	R	R	R	R
Israel	A		S			S
Italy	R	R	R	R		R
Jamaica	Su	A	R	R	R	R
Japan	R	R	R	R		R
Jordan	A	R	A	R		R
Kazakhstan	A	A	R	A	R	R
Kenya	A	A	R	R		R
Kiribati			A	Su	R	R
Korea, North	A	A	A	A		
Korea, South	A	R	R	R		R
Kuwait	A	R	R	R		R
Kyrgyzstan	A	A	R	A		R
Laos	A	R	R	R	R	R
Latvia	R	A	R	A		R
Lebanon	A	R	A	R		R
Lesotho	Su	R	R	R	R	R
Liberia	A	R	R	R		R
Libya	A	R	A	R	S	R
Liechtenstein	A	A	R	A	S	R
Lithuania	R	A	R	A		R
Luxembourg	R	R	R	R		R
Madagascar	A	R	R	R	S	R
Malawi	A	R	R	A	S	R
Malaysia	A	R	R	R	R	R
Maldives	A	A	R	R	R	R
Mali		R	R	R		R
Malta	Su	R	R	R	R	R
Marshall Islands		A	R	A		R
Mauritania		A	R	A		R
Mauritius	Su	R	R	A		
Micronesia			R	A		R
Mexico	A	R	R	R	R	R
Moldova	A	A	R	A		R
Monaco	A	A	R	A		R
Mongolia	A	R	R	R		R
Montenegro		Su	Su	Su		Su
Morocco	A	R	R	R		R
Mozambique		A	A	A	S	R
Myanmar		R	R	A	S	R
Namibia		A	R	A	R	R
Nauru		A	R	A	R	R
Nepal	A	R	R	R	S	S
Netherlands	R	R	R	R		R
New Zealand	A	R	R	R	R	R
Nicaragua	R	R	R	R	R	R
Niger	Su	R	R	A	S	R
Nigeria	A	R	R	R	R	R
Niue		A	A	(Note: The Cook Islands and Niue, two associated states of New Zealand which have had their "full treaty-making capacity" recognised by United Nations Secretariat, are not parties to the treaty but consider themselves bound by its provisions by virtue of their administration by New Zealand when the latter ratified the NPT.)	A	R
North Korea	A	A		(Note: Withdrew 10 Jan 2003)		
North Macedonia	A	Su	A	Su		R
Norway	R	R	R	R		R
Oman		A	R	A		R
Pakistan	Su	R	R			
Palau		A	A	A	R	R
Palestine (see UN and Palestine)	A	A	R	A	R	R
Panama	A	R	R	R	R	R
Papua New Guinea	Su	A	R	A		S
Paraguay	A	A	R	R	R	R
Peru	A	R	R	R	S	R
Philippines	A	R	R	R	R	R
Poland	R	R	R	R		R
Portugal	R	R	R	A		R
Qatar	A	R	R	A		R
Romania	R	R	R	R		R
Russia	R	R	R	R		R
Rwanda	Su	R	R	A		R
Saint Kitts and Nevis	Su	A	R	A	R	R
Saint Lucia	Su	Su	R	Su	R	R
Saint Vincent and the Grenadines	Su	Su	R	Su	R	R
Samoa		A	R	A	R	R
San Marino		R	R	R	R	R
São Tomé and Príncipe		A	Ac	A	S	S
Saudi Arabia	A	R	R	A		
Senegal	A	R	R	R		R
Serbia	Su	Su	A	Su		R
Seychelles		A	R	A	S	R
Sierra Leone	A	R	R	A		R
Singapore		R	R	R		R
Slovakia	Su	Su	R	Su		R
Slovenia	A	Su	R	Su		R
Solomon Islands	Su	Su	A	Su		S
Somalia		S	A	R		
South Africa	A	R	R	A	R	R
South Sudan						
Spain	R	R	R	A		R
Sri Lanka	A	R	R	R		S
Sudan	A	A	A	R	S	R
Suriname		A	A	Su		R
Sweden	R	R	R	R		R
Switzerland	R	R	R	R		R
Syria	A	S	A	R		
Tajikistan	A	A	R	A		R
Tanzania	A	R	R	A	S	R
Thailand	R	R	R	A	R	R
Togo	A	R	R	R	S	R
Tonga	Su	A	A	Su		
Trinidad and Tobago	Su	A	A	R		R
Tunisia	A	R	R	R		R
Turkey	R	R	R	R		R
Turkmenistan		A	R	A		R
Tuvalu			A	Su	R	S
Uganda	A	A	R	A		R
Ukraine	Su	R	R	A		R
United Arab Emirates		R	R	A		R
United Kingdom	R	R	R	R		R
United States	R	R	R	R		S
Uruguay	R	A	R	R	R	R
Uzbekistan		A	R	A		R
Vanuatu		Su	A	A	R	R
Vatican City (see UN and Holy See)	A	A	R	A	R	R
Venezuela	R	R	R	R	R	R
Vietnam	A	R	R	A	R	R
Yemen	A	R	R	R		S
Zambia		A	R	A	S	R
Zimbabwe		A	R	A	S	R

== See also ==
- List of parties to the Biological Weapons Convention
- List of parties to the Chemical Weapons Convention
- List of parties to the Comprehensive Nuclear-Test-Ban Treaty
- List of parties to the Treaty on the Non-Proliferation of Nuclear Weapons
- List of parties to the Treaty on the Prohibition of Nuclear Weapons
- List of parties to the Partial Nuclear Test Ban Treaty
