= Permanent Observer of the Holy See to the United Nations in Geneva =

Diplomatic mission of the Holy See at UN Agency

The Permanent Observer of Holy See to the United Nations in Geneva is the representative of the Holy See to the European office of the United Nations in Geneva, Switzerland. The Church also has a representative at the headquarters of the United Nations in New York who is known as the Permanent Observer of the Holy See to the United Nations.

The Permanent Observer holds the diplomatic rank of Apostolic Nuncio and the ecclesiastical title of a titular archbishop.

== Permanent Observers ==
- Henri de Rietmatten (1967 – 1971)
- Silvio Luoni (1971 – 15 May 1978)
- Jean Rupp (1978 – 1980)
- Edoardo Rovida (7 March 1981 – 26 January 1985)
- Justo Mullor García (3 March 1985 – 30 November 1991)
- Paul Fouad Tabet (1991–1995)
- Giuseppe Bertello (1995 – 27 December 2000)
- Diarmuid Martin (17 January 2001 – 3 May 2003)
- Silvano Maria Tomasi, C.S. (10 June 2003 – 2016)
- Ivan Jurkovič (13 February 2016 – 5 June 2021)
- Fortunatus Nwachukwu (17 December 2021 – 15 March 2023)
- Ettore Balestrero (21 June 2023 – present)

== See also ==
- Permanent Observer of the Holy See to the United Nations (UN headquarters; New York)
- Holy See and the United Nations
- Multilateral foreign policy of the Holy See
- Foreign relations of the Holy See
