= Permanent Observer of the Holy See to the United Nations =

Diplomatic mission of the Holy See in the UN

- Seal of the Permanent Observer Mission
- Incumbent; Christophe Zakhia El-Kassis since July 25, 2026
- Nominator: The Pope
- Inaugural holder: Alberto Giovannetti
- Formation: 1964; 62 years ago

The Permanent Observer of the Holy See to the United Nations is the representative of the Holy See (Vatican) at the United Nations (UN). This diplomatic mission does not have the status of Permanent Representative because the Holy See is not a UN member. The Holy See has had observer state status since 1964, a status accorded only one other entity, the State of Palestine.

- The first diplomat the Holy See sent as its Permanent Observer, Alberto Giovannetti, was a priest rather than a bishop. He had not yet risen to the rank of apostolic nuncio, the senior rank of the Vatican diplomatic corps.
- The second Permanent Observer, Giovanni Cheli, was given the personal rank of nuncio and ordained a bishop in 1978 after five years representing the Holy See at the UN. (Note: The change in Cheli's status was accomplished very quickly during the brief papacy of Pope John Paul I.) Since then all those appointed to the position have been titular archbishops with the rank of nuncio.

== Permanent Observers ==
- Alberto Giovannetti (1964 – 1973)
- Giovanni Cheli (25 July 1973 – 18 September 1986)
- Renato Raffaele Martino (3 December 1986 – 1 October 2002)
- Celestino Migliore (30 October 2002 – 17 July 2010)
- Francis Assisi Chullikatt (17 July 2010 – 1 July 2014)
- Bernardito Auza (1 July 2014 – 1 October 2019)
- Gabriele Giordano Caccia (16 November 2019 – 7 March 2026)
- Christophe Zakhia El-Kassis (25 July 2026 – present)

== See also ==
- Permanent Observer of the Holy See to the United Nations in Geneva
- Holy See and the United Nations
- Multilateral foreign policy of the Holy See
- Foreign relations of the Holy See
- United Nations General Assembly observers
