= Macé (surname) =

Macé is a French surname.

People with the surname include:

- Benjamin Macé (born 1989), French speed skater
- Charles J. V. Macé (1898–1919), French flying ace
- Gérard Macé (born 1946), French poet
- Jean Macé (1815–1894), French educator, journalist and politician
- Lilou Macé (born 1977), French-American video blogger

== See also ==
- Mace (surname)
