= Obihiro Centennial City Museum =

- 帯広百年記念館
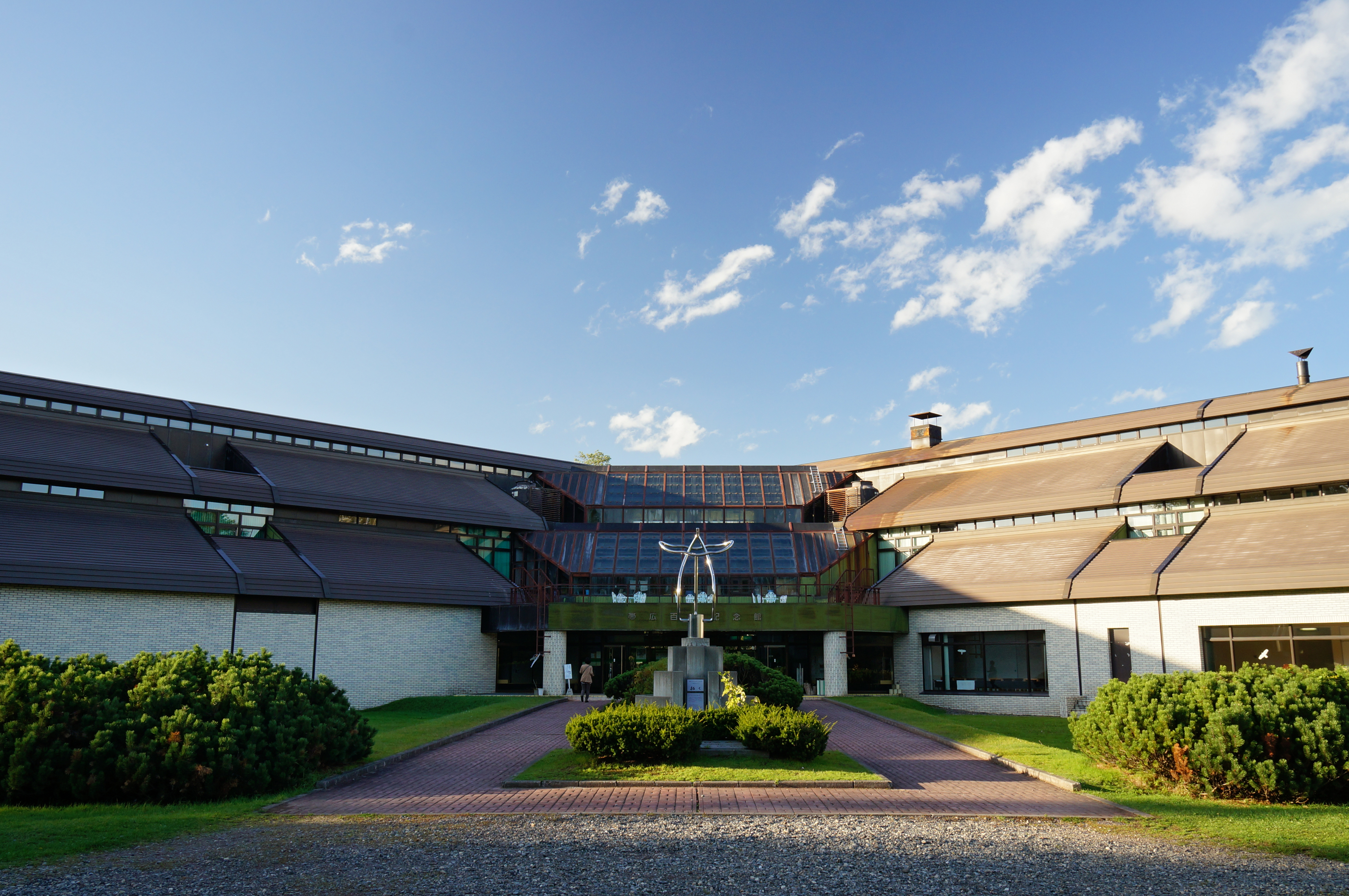
- Interactive map of the Obihiro Centennial City Museum area

General information
- Location: 2 Midorigaoka, Obihiro, Hokkaidō, Japan
- Coordinates: 42°54′26″N 143°11′11″E
- Opened: 1982

Website
- Official website

Obihiro Centennial City Museum (帯広百年記念館, Obihiro Hyakunen Kinenkan) opened in Obihiro, Hokkaidō, Japan in 1982. It exhibits materials relating to the natural history, local history, and industries of Obihiro and of Tokachi more generally. There is an information centre dedicated to the history and culture of the Ainu and, in the museum annex, a centre for buried cultural properties. The collection includes an assemblage of Jōmon finds from the Yachiyo A site that has been designated an Important Cultural Property.

== See also ==
- List of Cultural Properties of Japan - archaeological materials (Hokkaidō)
- List of Cultural Properties of Japan - historical materials (Hokkaidō)
- List of Historic Sites of Japan (Hokkaidō)
- Hokkaido Obihiro Museum of Art
