= Estádio Pedro Benedetti =

Coordinates: 23°40′08.0″S 46°28′14.0″W

Pedro Benedetti
- Interactive map of Pedro Benedetti
- Full name: Estádio Municipal Pedro Benedetti
- Location: Mauá, SP
- Owner: Municipality of Mauá
- Capacity: 8,000
- Surface: Natural grass
- Field size: 105 by 68 metres (114.8 yd × 74.4 yd)
- Public transit: Mauá

Construction
- Built: 1968
- Opened: 1984
- Renovated: 1994, 2006, 2009
- Cost: Cr$550,000,000

Tenants
- Mauaense; Mauá

The Estádio Municipal Pedro Benedetti is a football stadium in Mauá, São Paulo, Brazil. It is the home ground of Grêmio Mauaense and Mauá Futebol. The stadium has a maximum capacity of 11,986, although only up to 8,567 fans are allowed in by the Military Firefighters Corps.

== History ==
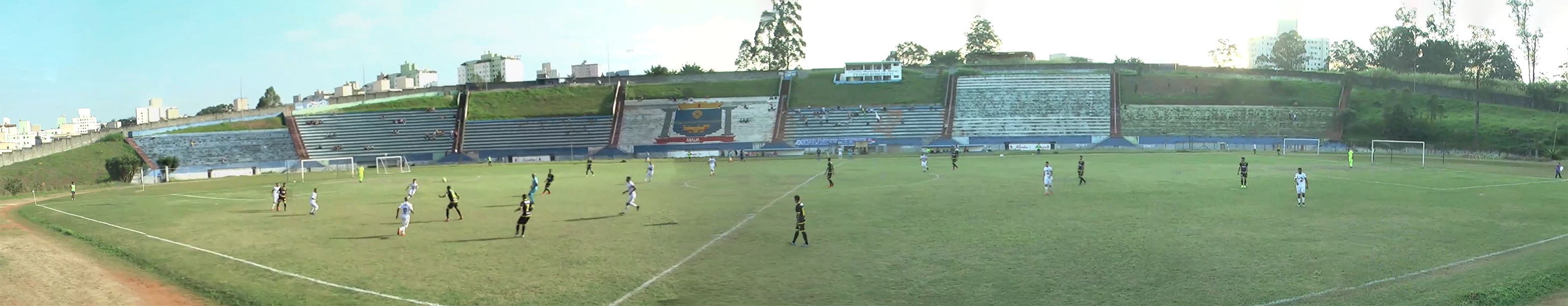
Estádio Pedro Benedetti during a derby between Mauaense and Mauá.

The original project of a football stadium in Mauá was conceived in 1962 and included a baseball field, three swimming pools, two basketball courts, two tennis courts and a bocce court, but nowadays the area is occupied by three amateur football fields and a police station. Construction began in 1967, but the progress was stalled from 1971 to 1983, due to political disputes. In 1979, Corinthians was interested in taking over and build their own stadium in place, but the deal with the Mauá City Hall fell through.

The construction was concluded in 1984. The municipal stadium of Mauá has only one set of uncovered stands, built of reinforced concrete over a slope and features no floodlights. The maximum capacity at the time was 15,000. For the opening match, a friendly was arranged by Mauaense against São Paulo on 8 December 1984. The visitors won 2–1.

The following year, Mauaense became owners of the stadium, but that only lasted until 1991, when control was given back to the local government. Santo André played part of its home games during the 1985 season. In 1991, the stadium was named after local amateur footballer Pedro Benedetti.

The ground was used as the home venue for the Palmeiras reserves team for the 2009 season, as the São Paulo club made a deal to improve the pitch and the locker rooms.

== Location ==
The stadium is located in the Parque São Vicente neighbourhood of Mauá. The area in which the stadium is built was donated by the Almeida Prado company.
