= Holy See and the United Nations =

Holy See

United Nations membership
- Membership: Permanent observer
- Since: 1964
- Permanent Observer: Vacant

The Holy See is not a member of the United Nations (not having applied for membership) but was granted permanent observer state (i.e., non-member state) status on 6 April 1964. In that capacity, it has the right to attend all sessions of the United Nations General Assembly, the United Nations Security Council, and the United Nations Economic and Social Council to observe their work. Accordingly, the Holy See has established permanent observer missions in New York and in Geneva and has been able to influence the decisions and recommendations of the United Nations.

== History ==
=== Relationship with the League of Nations ===
During a 1919 conference at the League of Nations, a motion was proposed to encourage international cooperation with the Holy See. The motion, encouraged by delegations in Belgium and Switzerland, was adopted by a majority of participants, although it met resistance from the United Kingdom and Italy. Reports indicated that the Holy See regretted its exclusion and wished to be admitted to the League of Nations.

In 1923 however, the Holy See took a different position and stated that its only competency was in matters of elucidation of questions of principle in morality and public international law. In 1924, the Holy See received an invitation from a British delegate to become a member of the League, but this proposition received no official reaction from other Member States.

When it became clear that the ongoing territorial dispute with Italy (resolved with 1929's Lateran Treaty) precluded it from joining the League, the Vatican supported the activities of l'Union Catholique d'Etudes Internationales, a lobby group whose members mainly comprised Catholic activists employed as League officials. Prominent members included Gonzague de Reynold and Oskar Halecki, while the League's first and second Secretaries-General, Eric Drummond and Joseph Avenol, were sympathetic to the organization's aims. The group had particular success in promoting the Holy See's vision of international affairs within the International Committee on Intellectual Cooperation, forerunner to UNESCO.

=== Non-participation between 1944 and 1964 ===
In 1944, the Holy See made tentative inquiries about the possibility of becoming a UN Member. US Secretary of State Cordell Hull replied that:

It would seem undesirable that the question of the membership of the Vatican State be raised now. As a diminutive state the Vatican would not be capable of fulfilling all the responsibilities of membership in an organization whose primary purpose is the maintenance of international peace and security. ... Membership in the organization would not seem to be consonant with the provisions of Article 24 of the Lateran Treaty, particularly as regards spiritual status and participation in the possible use of force. Non-membership would not preclude the participation of the Vatican State in social and humanitarian activities of the organization nor impair its traditional role in the promotion of peace by its usual influence.

Secretary Hull did not distinguish between the Holy See and the Vatican City State; and second, at the time membership in the United Nations was still limited to the Allies of World War II. Neither the Holy See nor the Vatican City State chose to apply for UN membership at that time.

=== Permanent observer since 1964 ===
Seal of the Permanent Observer Mission of the Holy See to the United Nations.

Since 6 April 1964, the Holy See has been a permanent observer state at the United Nations. In that capacity, the Holy See has since had a standing invitation to attend all the sessions of the General Assembly, the United Nations Security Council, and the United Nations Economic and Social Council to observe their work, and to maintain a permanent observer mission at the UN headquarters in New York. Accordingly, the Holy See has established a Permanent Observer Mission in New York and has sent representatives to all open meetings of the General Assembly and of its Main Committees.

As a matter of diplomatic courtesy, since 1964, the Holy See was also allowed to make formal policy statements in the General Assembly, both during the General Debates and during the discussion of the various separate issues contained in the agenda of the General Assembly. Notably, popes Paul VI, John Paul II, Benedict XVI, and Francis were invited to address the General Assembly.

In addition, the Holy See was invited to observe all open meetings of the intergovernmental subsidiary bodies of the General Assembly. The Holy See was frequently allowed to participate in the private negotiations leading to the adoption of the General Assembly's decisions and resolutions. The Holy See was not allowed, however, to co-sponsor draft decisions or resolutions, to make points of order, or to exercise the right of reply. If the Holy See wished to circulate written proposals or position papers, it required the assistance of a member state that was willing to present those proposals or papers as its own.

The Holy See took advantage of the prerogatives of its observer status to incorporate its Christian values within the decisions and recommendations of the United Nations. Notable was a successful effort, in cooperation with like-minded countries, to ensure the adoption of a United Nations Declaration banning all forms of Human Cloning, and it opposed the adoption of a resolution on sexual orientation and gender identity proposed by the European Union in the General Assembly; a similar UNHRC-specific resolution on LGBT rights proposed by the Republic of South Africa was successfully passed in the United Nations Human Rights Council.

In a 2025 interview, Pope Leo XIV said that the United Nations "has lost its ability to bring people together on multilateral issues".

==== Opposition to status ====
From 1999, the non-governmental organization Catholics for Choice lobbied against the participation of the Holy See in the United Nations. Supporters of this campaign argued that the Holy See is a religious organization and not a state, and that, therefore, it should not have the right to participate, in a position analogous to that of states, in the intergovernmental decision-making process on social, cultural, and economic matters. They also cited the lack of equal status for other religions and the Vatican representatives' history of pushing Catholic views on reproductive health.

==== Confirmed status in 2004 ====
In 2004, the UN General Assembly confirmed the Holy See's status as a Permanent Observer. Currently, the Holy See has the right to participate in the general debate of the General Assembly and to intervene in the discussion of any issue inscribed in the agenda of that assembly. It has the right to participate in all meetings open to all Member States, the right to make points of order and to exercise the right of reply, the right to circulate proposals and position papers as official documents, and the right to co-sponsor draft resolutions and decisions. Commenting on its status, Archbishop Celestino Migliore, the then Holy See Permanent Observer to the United Nations, said "We have no vote because this is our choice." He added that the Holy See considers that its current status "is a fundamental step that does not close any path for the future. The Holy See has the requirements defined by the UN statute to be a member state and, if in the future it wished to be so, this resolution would not impede it from requesting it."

== Across the United Nations System ==
=== At the United Nations Economic and Social Council ===
The Holy See is also an observer to the United Nations Economic and Social Council (ECOSOC), attending all of its meetings and able to make proposals and policy statements regarding all issues that are of concern. Since 22 July 1977, the Holy See has had a standing invitation to attend the sessions of ECOSOC's regional commissions on an equal footing with those State Members of the United Nations who are not members of those regional commissions. In addition, the Holy See enjoys full membership in some specialized agencies of the United Nations dependent on ECOSOC such as WIPO, ITU, and UPU. In order to follow the work of those ECOSOC subsidiary bodies and agencies that meet regularly in Geneva, the Holy See has established a Permanent Observer Mission in Geneva.

=== At the United Nations Security Council ===
Having observer status at the United Nations, the Holy See is also able to observe all open meetings of the United Nations Security Council. Occasionally, the Holy See has asked and been allowed to make statements in public meetings of the Security Council. The Permanent Observer spoke against war in Iraq shortly before the invasion, on the regulation of armaments, and on the protection of civilians during armed conflicts. On some occasions, the Holy See has submitted documents to the Security Council, such as the 29 April 2003 statement of Patriarchs and Bishops of Iraq on religious freedom.

Meanwhile, the Holy See does not recognize People's Republic of China, a permanent member of the UNSC, as a legitimate state. The Holy See does maintain relations with the government of the Republic of China in Taipei, considering the Republic of China as the representative government of China.

=== At the world conferences on social and economic issues ===
The Holy See has also been an active participant in the World Conferences on social and economic issues convened by the United Nations. It had a major impact on the negotiations and outcome of the 1994 Cairo Population Conference, the 1995 Beijing Conference on Women, and the 2001 General Assembly Special Session on HIV/AIDS.

== Multilateral treaties ==
=== Negotiation of multilateral treaties ===
Since the Holy See is legally capable of ratifying international treaties, and does ratify them, it is invited to participate – on equal footing with States – in the negotiation of most universal, International law-making treaties held under the auspices of the United Nations. Being a negotiating party, it is able to make substantive proposals, reject the proposals of other negotiating parties, request a vote, and even vote. The Holy See has participated actively in the negotiation of the 1998 Rome Statute of the International Criminal Court, the 1997 Terrorist Bombing Convention, and the 2006 Convention on the Rights of Persons with Disabilities, among others.

=== Participation in multilateral treaties ===
The Holy See is a state-party to numerous multilateral treaties:

Treaty	Date of signature	Date of ratification, accession or acceptance
1864 Convention for the Amelioration of the Condition of the Wounded in Armies in the Field		9 May 1868
1883 Paris Convention for the Protection of Industrial Property		21 Jul 1960
1886 Berne Convention for the Protection of Literary and Artistic Works		19 Jul 1935
1925 Protocol for the Prohibition of the Use of Asphyxiating, Poisonous or Other Gases, and of Bacteriological Methods of Warfare		18 Oct 1966
1936 International Convention concerning the Use of Broadcasting in the Cause of Peace		5 Jan 1967
1949 First Geneva Convention for the Amelioration of the Condition of the Wounded and Sick in Armed Forces in the Field	08 Dec 1949	22 Feb 1951
1949 Second Geneva Convention for the Amelioration of the Condition of Wounded, Sick, and Shipwrecked Members of Armed Forces at Sea	08 Dec 1949	22 Feb 1951
1949 Third Geneva Convention relative to the Treatment of Prisoners of War	08 Dec 1949	22 Feb 1951
1949 Fourth Geneva Convention relative to the Protection of Civilian Persons in Time of War	08 Dec 1949	22 Feb 1951
1949 Protocol on Road Signs and Signals		1 Oct 1956
1954 Hague Convention for the Protection of Cultural Property in the Event of Armed Conflict		24 Feb 1958
1954 Protocol for the Protection of Cultural Property in the Event of Armed Conflict		24 Feb 1958
1955 Agreement on Signs for Road Works, amending the European Agreement of 16 September 1950 supplementing the 1949 Convention on Road Traffic and the 1949 Protocol on Road Signs and Signals		1 Oct 1956
1956 Convention Relating to the Status of Refugees	21 May 1952	15 Mar 1956
1951 Convention on the Recovery Abroad of Maintenance	20 Jun 1956	5 Oct 1964
1958 Convention on the Recognition and Enforcement of Foreign Arbitral Awards		14 May 1975
1961 Single Convention on Narcotic Drugs, as amended by the 1975 Protocol amending the Single Convention on Narcotic Drugs		7 Jan 1976
1963 Vienna Convention on Consular Relations	24 Apr 1963	8 Oct 1970
1966 International Convention on the Elimination of All Forms of Racial Discrimination	21 Nov 1966	1 May 1969
1967 Protocol Relating to the Status of Refugees		8 Jun 1967
1967 Convention Establishing the World Intellectual Property Organization	14 Jul 14 1967	20 Jan 1975
1968 Nuclear Non-Proliferation Treaty		25 Feb 1971
1969 Vienna Convention on the Law of Treaties	30 Sep 1969	25 Feb 1977
1971 Convention on Psychotropic Substances	21 Feb 1971	7 Jan 1976
1971 Convention for the Protection of Producers of Phonograms Against Unauthorized Duplication of Their Phonograms	29 Oct 1971	4 Apr 1977
1972 Protocol Amending the Single Convention on Narcotic Drugs	25 Mar 1972	7 Jan 1976
1972 Convention on the Prohibition of the Development, Production, and Stockpiling of Bacteriological (Biological) and Toxin Weapons and on their Destruction (Biological Weapons Convention)		04 Jan 2002
1972 Convention Concerning the Protection of the World Cultural and Natural Heritage		07 Oct 1982
1976 Protocol to the Agreement on the Importation of Educational, Scientific and Cultural Materials of 22 November 1950		22 Feb 1980
1977 Protocol I relating to the Protection of Victims of International Armed Conflicts	12 Dec 1977	21 Nov 1985
1977 Protocol II relating to the Protection of Victims of Non-International Armed Conflicts	12 Dec 1977	21 Nov 1985
1980 Convention on Prohibitions or Restrictions on the Use of Certain Conventional Weapons Which May be Deemed to be Excessively Injurious or to Have Indiscriminate Effects (Convention on Certain Conventional Weapons)		22 Jul 1997
1980 Protocol I to the Convention on Certain Conventional Weapons on Non-Detectable Fragments		22 Jul 1997
1980 Protocol II to the Convention on Certain Conventional Weapons on Prohibitions or Restrictions on the Use of Mines, Booby-Traps and Other Devices		22 Jul 1997
1980 Protocol III to the Convention on Certain Conventional Weapons Prohibitions or Restrictions on the Use of Incendiary Weapons		22 Jul 1997
1989 United Nations Convention on the Rights of the Child	20 Apr 1990	20 Apr 1990
1990 Amendment to the Montreal Protocol on Substances that Deplete the Ozone Layer		5 May 2008
1992 Convention on the Prohibition of the Development, Production, Stockpiling and Use of Chemical Weapons and on their Destruction	14 Jan 1993	12 May 1999
1992 Amendment to the Montreal Protocol on Substances that Deplete the Ozone Layer		5 May 2008
1992 Amendment to article 8 of the International Convention on the Elimination of All Forms of Racial Discrimination		14 Mar 2002
1993 Convention on the prohibition of the development, production, stockpiling, and use of chemical weapons and on their destruction (Chemical Weapons Convention)	14 Jan 1993	12 May 1999
1993 Amendments to the 1980 Protocol on Prohibitions or Restrictions on the Use of Mines, Booby-Traps and Other Devices to the 1980 Convention on Certain Conventional Weapons		22 Jul 1997
1995 Amendment to article 43 (2) of the Convention on the Rights of the Child		15 Aug 1996
1995 Protocol IV on Blinding Laser Weapons to the Convention on Prohibitions or Restrictions on the Use of Certain Conventional Weapons which may be deemed to be Excessively Injurious or to have Indiscriminate Effects		22 Jul 1997
1995 Grains Trade Convention	20 Jun 1995	28 Jun 1995
1996 Comprehensive Nuclear-Test-Ban Treaty	24 Sep 1996	18 Jul 2001
1997 Convention on the Prohibition of the Use, Stockpiling, Production and Transfer of Anti-Personnel Mines and on their Destruction	4 Dec 1997	17 Feb 1998
2000 Optional Protocol on the Involvement of Children in Armed Conflict	10 Oct 2000	24 Oct 2001
2000 Optional Protocol to the Convention on the Rights of the Child on the Sale of Children, Child Prostitution and Child Pornography	10 Oct 2000	24 Oct 2001
2003 Protocol to the Convention on Prohibitions or Restrictions on the Use of Certain Conventional Weapons which may be deemed to be Excessively Injurious or to have Indiscriminate Effects on Explosive Remnants of War		13 Dec 2005
2008 Convention on Cluster Munitions	3 Dec 2008	3 Dec 2008
2017 Treaty on the Prohibition of Nuclear Weapons	20 Sep 2017	20 Sep 2017

== See also ==
- Permanent Observer of the Holy See to the United Nations
- Permanent Observer of the Holy See to the United Nations in Geneva
- Category:Permanent Observers of the Holy See to UNEP and UN-HABITAT
- Multilateral foreign policy of the Holy See
- Foreign relations of the Holy See
- Legal status of the Holy See
- United Nations General Assembly observers
