= Joey Kirkpatrick =

American glass artist

- Born: 1952 (age 72–73); Des Moines, Iowa, U.S.
- Education: University of Iowa, Iowa State University
- Occupation(s): Glass artist, sculptor, wire artist, educator
- Partner: Flora Mace
- Website: www.kirkpatrick-mace.com

Joey Kirkpatrick (born 1952) is an American glass artist, sculptor, wire artist, and educator. She has taught glassblowing at Pilchuck Glass School. Since the 1970s, her artistic partner has been Flora Mace and their work is co-signed. Kirkpatrick has won numerous awards including honorary fellow by the American Craft Council (2005).

Kirkpatrick and Mace have shared a home and art studio in Seattle, Washington and a farm in the Olympic Peninsula.

== Early life and education ==
Joey Kirkpatrick was born in 1952 in Des Moines, Iowa. She attended the University of lowa (BFA degree, 1975); and Iowa State University (course work 1978 to 1979).

Kirkpatrick taught drawing at the Art Center in Des Moines, and used a series of dolls for the still life studies, and the same dolls became inspiration for her later work. She worked as a wire sculptor early in her creations, which is something that has also informed her later work. In 1979, Kirkpatrick met Mace through Dale Chihuly at Pilchuk Glass School in Stanwood, Washington.

== Career ==
Kirkpatrick and Mace are known for their oversized glass fruit and their work highlighting technical glass skills. Their body of artwork has been made from diverse materials including blown glass, glass vessels, and sculptures fabricated with wood, glass, and mixed media.

Kirkpatrick and Mace have art in many public museum collections including the Portland Art Museum, Corning Museum of Glass; the Detroit Institute of Arts; the Museum of Fine Art, Boston; Seattle Art Museum; the Metropolitan Museum of Art, Krannert Art Museum, Hokkaido Museum of Modern Art, the Smithsonian American Art Museum, and Musee des Arts Decoratifs, Lausanne.
