= TNT Sports (Brazil) =

Brazilian programming block broadcast on TNT and Space

TNT Sports Brazil
- Country: Brazil
- Headquarters: Rio de Janeiro, RJ, Brazil; Sao Paulo, SP, Brazil

Programming
- Language: Portuguese
- Picture format: 480i (SDTV); 1080i (HDTV)

Ownership
- Owner: Skydance (via TNT Sports International)

History
- Launched: 2004 (as a free-to-air TV block); January 20, 2007 (as a cable channel); June 8, 2026 (cable channel's relaunch)
- Closed: 2015 (as a free-to-air TV block); September 25, 2018 (as a cable channel); July 19, 2026 (cable channel's relaunch)
- Former names: Esporte Interativo (2004-2021)

Links
- Website: tntsports.com.br

Availability

Streaming media
- TNT Sports Go: Watch live

TNT Sports Brazil is a subsidiary of Skydance through TNT Sports International in Brazil responsible for sports broadcasts on TNT and Space channels in the country.

Esporte Interativo started as a television channel, inaugurated on January 20, 2007, with the live broadcast of a Premier League match between Chelsea and Liverpool. From 2015, it became part of Turner Broadcasting System Latin America. Turner announced in 2018 the discontinuation of all EI channels in Brazil. Part of the programming, such as the exhibition of national and international football championships, started to be shown on the Brazilian versions of TNT and Space channels. With the standardization of Turner's sports channels in Latin America, it started to use the TNT Sports brand as of 2021.

== History ==
=== Partnership with RedeTV! and Rede Bandeirantes ===
The plan of the Esporte Interativo channel started in 2004, when the marketing agency TopSports launch the brand Esporte Interativo and established a partnership with the TV network RedeTV! to broadcast sports events like English Premier League, UEFA Champions League and NBA. In September 2004, after fights between TopSports and RedeTV!, the partnership was broken. Esporte Interativo took their events to Rede Bandeirantes, in three years of partnership it broadcast events like UEFA Champions League, La Liga, English Premier League and Lega Calcio.

=== Own channel and growth ===
On January 20, 2007, the Esporte Interativo channel started to broadcast free-to-air on satellite Star One C2, on the frequency 980 MHz vertical, replacing Amazon Sat. On June 10, 2010, the Esporte Interativo channel started to broadcast in São Paulo, channel 36 UHF, and was created the Rede Esporte Interativo, to debut the network an interview with Brazilian president, Luiz Inácio Lula da Silva, was aired. In 2011 the network renewed the broadcast rights for the UEFA Champions League, and gained the broadcast rights for UEFA Super Cup and UEFA Europa League. To celebrate the 5th birthday of the channel, was opened a new studio in São Paulo.

In July 2012, Esporte Interativo launched their new SVOD multiplatform product EI Plus in partnership with Log On, and in October, closed a partnership with Yahoo! Brasil and they launched a new sports website, the Yahoo! Esporte Interativo.

In 2013 the Turner Broadcasting System acquired 20% of the network, becoming a business partner and occupying 2 of 7 members in the administration of the network.

In August was announced a new channel of the network, the Esporte Interativo Nordeste, a regional sports network dedicated for the sports from Brazilian northeast, and the acquisition of six state's championships of the region.

=== Full purchase by Turner and third channel ===
In early 2015, Turner Broadcasting Company, the television arm of Time Warner, has closed a total purchase of Esporte Interativo, acquiring the part that was owned by Top Sports, Edgar Diniz marketing agency.

From January 26, 2015, when the contract was signed, Turner started to control the entire channel. The programmer provides high investments and a new time in EI, particularly in the technical apparatus. 2015 also saw the debut of a new channel, EI Max. Soon after, EI Nordeste was renamed EI Maxx and EI Max became EI Maxx 2.

As of July 1, 2017, EI Maxx was renamed Esporte Interativo and EI Maxx 2 was renamed Esporte Interativo 2. As a result, the free-to-air channel was renamed Esporte Interativo BR. In addition to the nomenclature change, the three channels also get a new graphic project.

=== End of the EI channels, moving to TNT and Space ===
On August 9, 2018, the channel announced on its Facebook page the deactivation of all of their TV channels in 40 days and moving all of their sports events to TNT and Space channels in Brazil, on their social media and on the over-the-top service EI Plus.

=== TNT Sports (Brasil) ===
On January 8, 2021, WarnerMedia, the parent company of Turner, announced the replacement of the Esporte Interativo brand by TNT Sports, a name that had been used since 2017 by a sports channel of the conglomerate in Argentina, and which would now serve for pan-regional standardization in Latin America. The new brand was officially adopted at midnight on January 17 across all of the group's social media, including EI Plus, which is now renamed Estádio TNT Sports. On television, the TNT Sports brand officially debuted during the match between Internazionale x Juventus, valid for the Serie A.

On June 4, 2026, Warner Bros. Discovery announced the launch of TNT Sports in its linear version, inaugurating it on the 8th, but temporarily. The signal was made available by Claro TV+, Sky, Oi TV and Vivo TV, as well as online providers. The new channel would only feature lives and programs focused on the 2026 FIFA World Cup, even without having the broadcasting rights for the tournament, leaving the operators' lineup after the World Cup ended.

== Exhibitions ==
=== Competitions ===
==== Football ====
===== Brazil =====
- Campeonato Paulista
- Campeonato Paulista Série A2
- Campeonato Paulista Under-20
- Campeonato Paulista de Futebol Feminino

===== Chile =====
- Chilean Primera División
- Primera B de Chile
- Copa Chile

===== International =====
- UEFA Champions League
- UEFA Super Cup
- UEFA Youth League
