= Su-mei Yu =

- Born: Bangkok, Thailand
- Partner: Italo Scanga

Su-mei Yu is a Thai and American restauranteur and author, based in San Diego.

== Early life and education ==
Yu was born in Bangkok to two parents of Chinese descent. In 1961 at age 15, she moved to the United States to attend a church-affiliated boarding school in Kentucky, where she began cooking.

She later attended Chapman University, graduating with a Bachelor's degree in liberal arts, and San Diego State University, graduating in 1968 with a Masters in Social Work.

== Career ==
In 1985, Yu opened Saffron Thai Grilled Chicken, a Thai restaurant on India Street in San Diego. In 2002, she opened Saffron Noodles and Saté adjacent to the original restaurant, and in 2013 opened Saffron at San Diego International Airport.

Yu's 2000 book, Cracking the Coconut: Classic Thai Home Cooking, won the 2000 IACP Award.

In 2019, Yu sold Saffron to Karina’s, a Mexican seafood restaurant chain. Yu stayed on as a consulting partner.

== Publications ==
- Cracking the Coconut: Classic Thai Home Cooking (2001)
- Asian Grilling: 85 Satay, Kebabs, Skewers and Other Asian-Inspired Recipes for Your Barbecue (2002)
- The Elements of Life: A Contemporary Guide to Thai Recipes and Traditions for Healthier Living (2009)
