= Kenichi Kuriyagawa =

Japanese painter and graphic designer (1911–1999)

- 栗谷川健一
- Born: 28 February 1911; Iwamizawa, Hokkaido, Japan
- Died: 12 August 1999 (aged 88); Sapporo, Hokkaido, Japan
- Known for: Tourism posters, flag and emblem of Hokkaido
- Awards: Order of the Rising Sun, Gold and Silver Rays (1992)

Kenichi Kuriyagawa (栗谷川健一, Kuriyagawa Ken'ichi; 28 February 1911 – 12 August 1999) was a Japanese painter and graphic designer. He is known for tourism posters depicting Hokkaido, for designing the flag and emblem of Hokkaido Prefecture adopted in 1967, and for founding the first design school in Hokkaido. The Hokkaido Museum of Modern Art has described him as the "father of Hokkaido design".

== Early life ==
Kuriyagawa was born in Iwamizawa, Hokkaido, in 1911, the seventh child and third son of the settler farmers Chutaro and Tamaki Hayashi. He was adopted days after his birth by his mother's younger sister Kikuyo and her husband Mamoru Kuriyagawa, a sawmill worker.

At Iwamizawa Elementary School he was encouraged by a teacher of art and music, Kohei Abe, and developed an early interest in painting. His adoptive father died of tuberculosis in 1922, after which he abandoned plans to attend art school.

== Sign painter ==
After leaving school in 1924, Kuriyagawa apprenticed at the Nakano Sign Shop in Sapporo, where he learned to paint large cinema signs and posters. The work gave him free entry to cinemas, and the camera angles and lighting effects he observed there later informed his poster compositions. In 1927 he moved to Otaru as a cinema sign painter for the Shochikuza Theatre, and in 1931 became independent, working for the Hakodate Shochikuza.

In 1932 he spent two weeks in Tokyo studying contemporary poster and sign technique. He founded an art group, the Design Research Society, and exhibited with it in Hakodate. In 1933 he produced a protest poster following the death in custody of the writer Takiji Kobayashi and displayed it in Hakodate; he was detained by the Special Higher Police for twenty days, and officers visited his home monthly until the end of the war in 1945.

After the Hakodate Shochikuza was destroyed in the Great Hakodate Fire of 1934, he moved to Sapporo and joined the Kanai Printing Company, where he learned plate-making. He returned to Hakodate in 1935 to work at the Tsuji Printing Company and was dismissed in May 1936.

== Poster designer ==
In 1936 Kuriyagawa established his own studio, Kuri-zuan-sha, supporting himself with shop decoration and carpentry. That year he won first prize in a winter tourism poster competition held by the Sapporo Railway Bureau of the Ministry of Railways with To Hokkaido, and won again the following year, leading to his appointment as a commissioned artist to the Bureau in 1938. Wartime restrictions on travel ended the work in 1940.

He returned to freelance work in 1946. In 1950 he designed the first poster for the Sapporo Snow Festival, a design used for eight consecutive years, and produced posters for the Akan, Daisetsuzan and Shikotsu-Toya national parks using four-colour separation for the first time in Japan.

In 1953 he won the top prize at the World Tourism Poster Competition organised by the International Union of Official Travel Organisations in Lisbon, for HOKKAIDO: An Ainu Girl Playing a Mukkuri. He won the competition again in Vienna in 1956 with HOKKAIDO: Lake Akan, which also took first place in the public vote.

Kuriyagawa considered relocating to Tokyo in the early 1950s but remained in Hokkaido for the rest of his career. He designed bid posters for the 1964 Summer Olympics in Tokyo and for the Sapporo Winter Olympics, and served on the design committee for the 1972 Winter Olympics from 1967 to 1972. Three of his Olympic posters are held by the Olympic Museum in Lausanne.

== Flag and emblem of Hokkaido ==
In 1967, as part of the commemorative projects marking the centenary of Hokkaido's founding, the prefectural government invited art organisations across Hokkaido to submit designs for a prefectural flag and emblem. More than 7,500 designs were received. On 31 March 1967 the selection committee adopted a proposal developed jointly by Kuriyagawa and instructors of the Hokkaido Design Institute, which he headed. The flag and emblem were promulgated on 1 May 1967 by Hokkaido Notification No. 775.

The emblem reinterprets the five-pointed star of the Hokkaido Development Commission's Hokushin flag as a seven-rayed star. It remained the basis of the prefectural government's visual identity following a 1992 redesign.

== Design education and later career ==
Kuriyagawa founded the Hokkaido Design Institute in 1962, the first institution for design education in Hokkaido, initially renting classrooms from a dressmaking school. It was reorganised in 1979 as the Hokkaido College of Art and Design, which closed in March 2015.

He had founded the Hokkaido district of the Japan Advertising Artists Association in 1952 and served as its district chairman. He became a director of the Japan Graphic Designers Association in 1978, and in 1982 founded the Hokkaido Design Council and became its first chairman, later serving as honorary chairman from 1991. He joined the construction planning committee for Sapporo Art Park in 1984 and became a director of its foundation in 1986.

He died of pneumonia in Sapporo on 12 August 1999, aged 88.

== Style ==
To convey the scale of the Hokkaido landscape, Kuriyagawa used extreme perspective and bird's-eye compositions, together with cinematic devices drawn from his years painting film signs, including long shots and strong contrasts of light and shade. He mixed poster colours with glue to thicken them and built up the surface with a painting knife, producing an oil-painting texture; the finished work was lit from the side and photographed for plate-making so that raking light caught the impasto. Historian Juha Saunavaara noted that Kuriyagawa's posters drew analogies between Hokkaido and the American frontier, depicting the region with expansive landscapes and western farming practices that evoked frontier symbolism.

== Public works ==
Kuriyagawa produced permanent architectural works across Hokkaido, including stage curtains for the Sapporo Citizens Hall (1958 and 1977), Shibetsu Civic Hall (1964) and Abashiri Civic Hall (1968); the permanent exhibition design for the Hokkaido Historical Museum (1968–1971); glass mosaic murals at Yoichi Town Hall (1971), Akan Town Hall (1973) and Sapporo Daiichi Hospital (1974); platform murals for the Sapporo Municipal Subway Tōzai Line (1974–1976) and Tōhō Line (1988); and Song of the Northern Country (1972), a glass mosaic for Sapporo Station later remade in ceramic.

He also designed product packaging and corporate identities for Hokkaido firms including Rokkatei, Snow Brand Foods and Sapporo Senshuan. In 2020 and 2021, Suntory licensed seven of his posters, made between 1955 and 1984, for limited-edition Hokkaido cans of The Premium Malt's.

== Collections ==
The Hokkaido Museum of Modern Art holds 234 works, comprising original paintings for his posters as well as easel paintings, among them Relaxing in the River (1959, oil on canvas). His work is also held by the Obihiro Museum of Art, the National Crafts Museum in Kanazawa, the Utsunomiya Museum of Art, and the Chukyo University Sports Museum.

In 1994 he donated prints to his former school in Iwamizawa; the rebuilt school houses a permanent Kuriyagawa Kenichi Gallery.

== Awards ==
- 1953: World Tourism Poster Competition, top prize, Lisbon
- 1956: World Tourism Poster Competition, top prize and first place in the public vote, Vienna
- 1959: Hokkaido Shimbun Culture Award
- 1969: Minister of Transport Award, All Japan Tourism Poster Competition
- 1972: Sapporo Citizens Art Award (inaugural recipient)
- 1983: Hokkaido Culture Award
- 1986: Minister of Education's Award for Regional Cultural Merit
- 1992: Order of the Rising Sun, Gold and Silver Rays, Fifth Class

The All Hokkaido Advertising Association established the Kuriyagawa Kenichi Award in his memory, presented annually to a creator judged to have produced outstanding work that year.

== Publications ==
- 栗谷川健一の世界 [The World of Kenichi Kuriyagawa] (in Japanese). Kodansha. 1982.
- Kamada, Toru (2012). 栗谷川健一 －北海道をデザインした男 [Kenichi Kuriyagawa: The Man Who Designed Hokkaido]. Museum Shinsho (in Japanese). Vol. 29. Hokkaido Shimbun Press.
