= Orestes Araújo =

Orestes Araújo (Mahón, 1853 - Montevideo, 1915) was a Uruguayan lecturer, schoolteacher and historian.

Born in Menorca, he settled in Montevideo in 1870 and worked in the newspaper La Paz, established by José Pedro Varela. Araújo helped him and his brother Jacobo in the implementation of a school reform, task which he undertook until 1889.

He wrote several didactic and reference works:

- Diccionario Geográfico del Uruguay (1900)
- Historia de la Escuela Uruguaya (1911)
