= Thiago Araújo =

Brazilian footballer

Personal information
- Full name: Thiago Luiz Moreira de Araújo
- Date of birth: February 18, 1988 (age 38)
- Place of birth: Curitiba, Brazil
- Height: 1.81 m (5 ft 11 in)
- Position: Defender

Team information
- Current team: Camboriú

Youth career
- 2005–2006: Paraná

Senior career*
Years	Team	Apps	(Gls)
–2009	Paraná		
2008	→ Juventus-SP (loan)		
2011–2012	J. Malucelli	0	(0)
2013	Central	0	(0)
2013	Viitorul Constanța	7	(0)
2014	São Paulo RS	0	(0)
2014	Campinense		
2015	Caldas Novas		
2015	Moto Club		
2015	Campinense		
2016	Goianésia	0	(0)
2016	CEOV Operário		
2017	Toledo		
2017	Tricordiano	0	(0)
2018	CEOV Operário		
2018	Trieste		
2019	Velo Club	0	(0)
2019	Metropolitano	0	(0)
2019–	Camboriú		
- * Club domestic league appearances and goals as of 21:31, 29 June 2019 (UTC)

Thiago Luiz Moreira de Araújo (born February 18, 1988), known as Thiago Araújo, is a Brazilian footballer who plays as a defender for Camboriú. In 2013 he went with fellow Brazilian player, Marcelina Emerson to play in Romania for Liga I club Viitorul Constanța.
