= Nélson de Araújo =

Brazilian writer (1926–1993)

Nélson Correia de Araújo (Capela, Sergipe, 4 September 1926 – Salvador, 7 April 1993) was a Brazilian writer. He was an author of numerous books on the history and people of Brazil, writer, publisher, copyholder, translator, photographer, journalist, reporter, folklore researcher, and a professor the History of Theater at the Universidade Federal da Bahia.

== Life and career ==
After graduating from the College Salesiano de Aracaju, Nelson de Araujo moved to Salvador and worked for many years as a journalist, translator, photographer, and documentarian. In 1957, he composed his inaugural book, An Accident in the Highway and Other Histories, for which he received the Gerhard Meyer award. Two years later he wrote scripts for the theater Companhia das Índias. In 1960, he spearheaded the Coleção Tule editorial section of the national newspaper of Bahia, and was later invited to teach the History of Theater at the Universidade Federal da Bahia. By 1965, he co-founded the Afro-Ásia Journal of the Center of Afro-Oriental Studies there.

During the 1970s, he completed scripts for the theater of Rosarosae, Rosaerosa and Solemnity of the Time and of the Faith, and A House in Your Name Rose, which was a commemoration of the Tercentenary of the Archdiocese of Bahia. In 1977, he wrote Five Solemnities of Recôncavo and Some Aspects of the Theater in Brazil in the 18th and 19th Centuries. In 1978, he produced his pinnacle academical work, History of the Theater, that was accompanied by Two Forms of Popular Theater of Recôncavo Baiano and The Pastoral Dance in Bahia. In 1980, he published La Percepcion Realidad African en el Brazil. During 1982, two more books were published, Between Melpômene and Clio (rehearsals) and O Teatro do Pobre: Notas de Cultura Popular. This same year received the Martim Gonçalves award for his theatrical works, and three years later was granted the title of Citizen of the City of Salvador.

Over the next five years he edited the popular Brazilian novels O Império do Divino visto pelos olhos de Pisa-Mansinho; Vida, paixão e morte republicana de Don Ramón Fernández y Fernández and Aventuras de um caçador de arcas em terras, mar e sonho, later gathered together in the Three Novels of the People From Bahia. In 1988, he left fiction and politics and by 1990 the pieces of Joana Angélica appeared, including; A Ripe Man to Die and the War of Magali. Also of this year he completed the History of Two Families, on the founding families of Dismel, a homecenter company of Bahia State. In 1991, four hundred years after the invasion of Bahia, he publish his largest fictional work, 1591, A Santa Inquisicao na Bahia e Outras Estorias and Oliveira Dos Campinhos: Passado e Presente de um Arraial do Reconcavo. It was published in 1992, the same year he released The Bitter Love of Belira and Roque and The Black Bird and your Girlfriend, and he also began work on his last book Pilar's Bells, which has yet to be released.

=== Audio-Visual Productions ===
He also participated in audio-visual productions as editor of Sound and Voice of Bahia (1968); director of the documentary Ilha de Tinharé (1973); Mines and Prospectors of Bahia (1974); Frederico Edelweiss (1976), The Last Major (1971), and authorship of the texts of The Villa of San Francisco of Conde (1969); Federal University of Bahia: 25 Years Later (1971); and The-Bon: a Japanese party in Recôncavo da Bahia (1979). In 1969, he received honors for his photographs of Carroussel, in II the Bahian Hall of Photography.

=== The Pequenos Mundos Trilogy ===
Regarding the academic trilogy, Pequenos Mundos, work initiated after Nélson decided to do an extensive field investigation on the popular forms of show and folklore in the interior of Bahia. His research and documentation concentrated of the communities residing in Recôncavo, North and Northeast, Rural Coast, Interior, San Francisco, Chapada Diamantina, Caetité, Valença, Região Cacaueira, Extremo Sul, the Pastoral area, and Extremo Oeste. He is credited with registering a true panorama of the culture of Bahia.

He wrote three volumes based on his research and had published volumes I (1986) e II (1988). Volume III was published in 1997, four years after his death.
