= Flora Mace =

American glass artist, sculptor

- Born: 1949 (age 75–76); Exeter, New Hampshire, U.S.
- Education: Plymouth State University, University of Utah, University of Illinois Urbana-Champaign
- Occupation(s): Glass artist, sculptor, educator
- Partner: Joey Kirkpatrick
- Website: www.kirkpatrick-mace.com

Flora C. Mace (born 1949) is an American glass artist, sculptor, and educator. She was the first woman to teach at Pilchuck Glass School. Since the 1970s, her artistic partner has been Joey Kirkpatrick and their work is co-signed. Mace has won numerous awards including honorary fellow by the American Craft Council (2005).

Kirkpatrick and Mace have shared a home and art studio in Seattle, Washington and a farm in the Olympic Peninsula.

== Biography ==
Mace was born in 1949 in Exeter, New Hampshire. She has a B.S. degree (1972) from Plymouth State College (now Plymouth State University); and in 1975 she took classes at University of Utah; and she received a M.F.A. degree (1976) from University of Illinois Urbana-Champaign.

In 1977, Mace was the first resident glass artist at WheatonArts (formally Wheaton Village, or Wheaton Art and Cultural Center). Mace was the first woman educator at Pilchuk Glass School in Stanwood, Washington, where she taught glassblowing. In 1979, Mace met Joey Kirkpatrick through Dale Chihuly at Pilchuk. Kirkpatrick and Mace are known for their oversized glass fruit.

Kirkpatrick and Mace have art in various public museum collections including the Portland Art Museum, Corning Museum of Glass; the Detroit Institute of Arts; the Museum of Fine Art, Boston; Seattle Art Museum; the Metropolitan Museum of Art, Krannert Art Museum, Hokkaido Museum of Modern Art, the Smithsonian American Art Museum (SAAM), and Musee des Arts Decoratifs, Lausanne. Mace and Kirkpatrick's work, Bird Pages: Cooper Hawk, was acquired by SAAM as part of the Renwick Gallery's 50th Anniversary Campaign.
