= Maurie De Araugo =

Australian rules footballer, born 1902

Personal information
- Full name: Alfred Maurice De Araugo
- Born: 24 May 1902; Bendigo, Victoria
- Died: 4 April 1966 (aged 63); Burwood, Victoria
- Original team: Sandhurst
- Height: 188 cm (6 ft 2 in)
- Weight: 86 kg (190 lb)

Playing career^{1}
Years	Club	Games (Goals)
1924	South Melbourne	1 (0)
1928	St Kilda	9 (6)
Total		10 (6)
- ^{1} Playing statistics correct to the end of 1928.

Alfred Maurice De Araugo (24 May 1902 – 4 April 1966) was an Australian rules footballer who played with South Melbourne and St Kilda in the Victorian Football League (VFL).
