= Mauá FC =

Mauá
- Full name: Mauá Futebol Treinamentos e Esportes
- Nickname: Índio (Indian)
- Founded: 23 October 2017; 8 years ago
- Ground: Pedro Benedetti
- Capacity: 8,567
- President: Vagner Alberto Tegi
- Head Coach: Thiago Constância
- League: Campeonato Paulista Segunda Divisão
- 2025: Paulista Segunda Divisão, 3rd of 15
Home colours	Away colours

Mauá Futebol Clube, commonly referred to as Mauá, is a Brazilian professional football club based in Mauá, São Paulo. They currently compete in the Campeonato Paulista Segunda Divisão, the fifth tier of the São Paulo state football league.
