= Mia Araujo =

Argentine-American painter

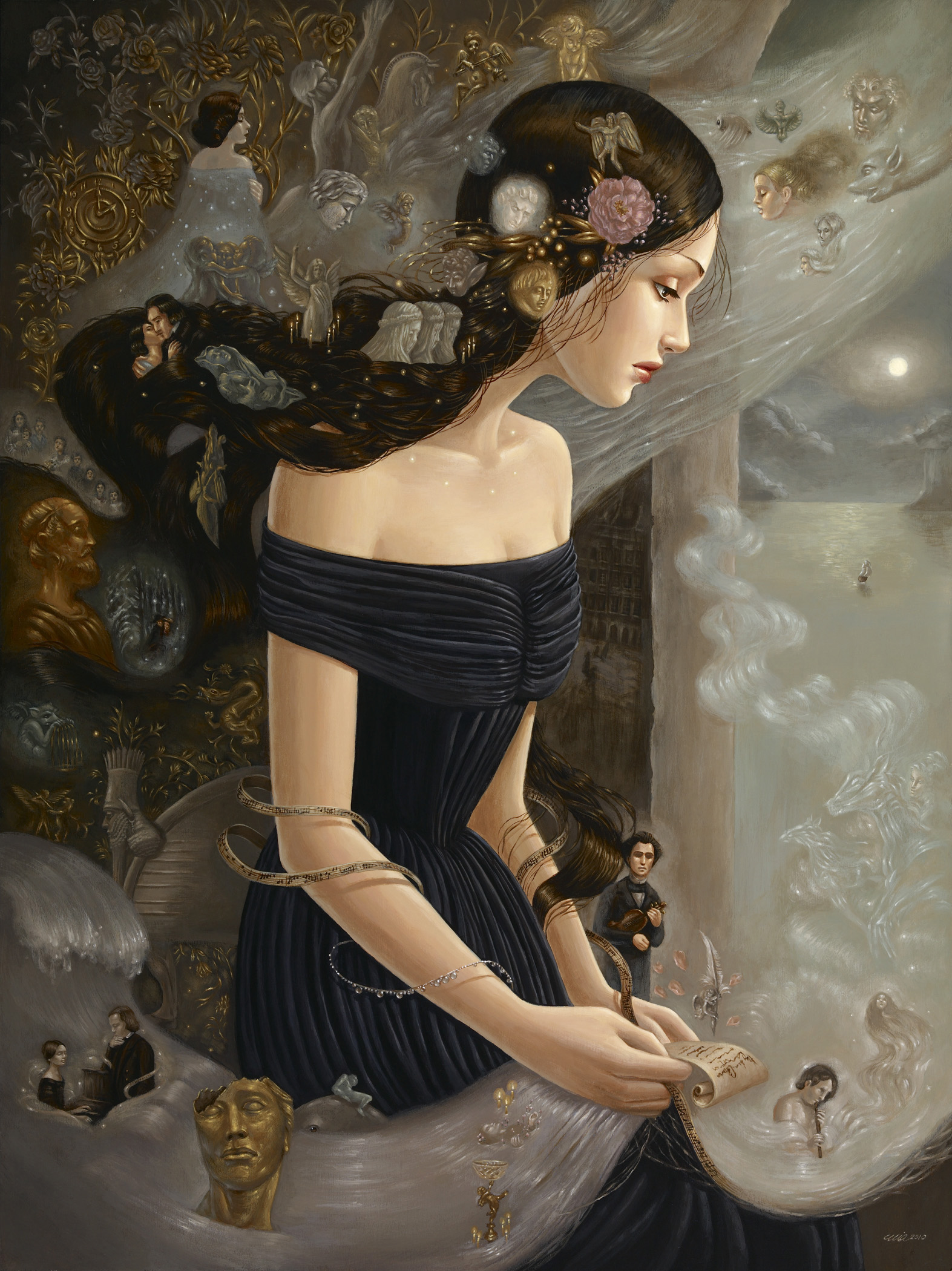
- Acrylic on wood, 18 x 24 inches
- Born: 1986 (age 39–40); Los Angeles, California
- Education: Otis College of Art and Design
- Known for: Painting
- Movement: Surrealism, Fantasy, Suggestivism

Mia Araujo (born 1986) is an Argentine-American painter who is best known for her elaborate and detailed works of surrealist and fantasy imagery. Her work has been shown in internationally recognized galleries, including Roq La Rue Gallery, in Seattle, Corey Helford Gallery, in California, Haven Gallery in Northport, New York, and Dorothy Circus Gallery, in Rome, Italy. Her work has been prominently featured in such high profile arts publications as Hi-Fructose Magazine, Juxtapoz, and Society of Illustrators of Los Angeles.

== Background ==
Born 1986 in Los Angeles, California, Mia graduated Valedictorian from the Otis College of Art and Design, with a Bachelor of Arts in Illustration and a minor in Creative Writing. Her work was first exhibited in the Roq La Rue Gallery, in 2008. Since then her work has since been featured in more than 25 galleries across the United States. Her paintings tend towards the movements of surrealism, fantasy and suggestivism and she lists some of her creative influences as Arthur Rackham, Hayao Miyazaki, Takehiko Inoue, Glen Keane, and Kinuko Craft.

== Into the Woods ==
On May 12, 2012, Araujo released her first solo exhibition, titled "Into the Woods," at Corey Helford Gallery. This particular collection centers conceptually around the synthesis of the self and Nature. Araujo situates her figures in the outdoors but simultaneously incorporates aspects of the inner, "truest" self into these paintings. The works are replete with fragments of the main figures' dreams, emotions, fears, and fantasies - all layered into surreal natural backdrops. In this way, she fuses idyllic ethereal imagery with darker, nightmarish impressions. Araujo cites Miyazaki’s film Princess Mononoke, the writings of John Muir, and Timothy Egan’s book The Big Burn as a few of her primary inspirations.
