= Jorge Mauá =

Brazilian footballer (born 1987)

Personal information
- Full name: Jorge do Vale de Araújo
- Date of birth: 22 January 1987 (age 39)
- Place of birth: São Paulo, Brazil
- Height: 1.76 m (5 ft 9 in)
- Position: Striker

Youth career
- União Suzano

Senior career*
Years	Team	Apps	(Gls)
2013–2014	Mauaense	18	(12)
2015	Nacional-SP	28	(16)
2016	Taubaté	16	(7)
2016	Mauaense	17	(17)
2016	São Caetano	3	(0)
2017	Juventus-SP	12	(2)
2017	Noroeste	1	(0)
2018	Atlético Cajazeirense	6	(2)
2018	Noroeste	9	(5)
2022	União Suzano	16	(5)
- * Club domestic league appearances and goals

Jorge do Vale de Araújo, better known as Jorge Mauá (born 22 January 1987), is a Brazilian striker who currently plays for amateur club Aliança de São João do Oeste/SC, atual campeão do Estadual de Amadores de Santa Catarina, 2024. He's among the all-time top scorers for Mauaense, his hometown club.

== Profile ==
Jorge Mauá started his career playing futsal for Corinthians, scoring more than 250 goals as a forward. At age 21, Mauá made the switch to association football, playing for União Suzano and Colegiales from Paraguay without much success. He kept playing in amateur leagues in Mauá until 2013, when he got offered a contract by local team Mauaense. He led the team in scoring during his tenure and quickly got promoted to upper-division teams such as Nacional and Taubaté. Jorge Mauá played for Atlético Cajazeirense in the 2018 Campeonato Paraibano.

In 2016, he returned to his hometown club and once again led the team in scoring, netting one goal per game on average. The stats caught the attention of Juventus da Mooca, but the striker had a disappointing 2017 Série A-2 run, scoring only two goals. A year later, he managed to regain his form playing for Noroeste, in the Campeonato Paulista Série A3.

After his contract with Noroeste expired, he came back to the amateur leagues while majoring in Physical Education.

Jorge Mauá returned to professional football in 2022, signing for União Suzano of the Campeonato Paulista Série A3. He scored a brace in his debut on 29 January, a 2–1 win against São José.
