= International Convention Concerning the Use of Broadcasting in the Cause of Peace =

1936 League of Nations treaty

The International Convention Concerning the Use of Broadcasting in the Cause of Peace is a 1936 League of Nations treaty whereby states agreed to prohibit the use of broadcasting for propaganda or the spreading of false news. It was the first international treaty to bind states to "restrict expression which constituted a threat to international peace and security".

== Creation ==
In 1933, the Assembly of the League of Nations authorised the drafting of a multilateral treaty on propaganda. The Convention resulted and it was concluded and signed on 23 September 1936 at a conference in Geneva, Switzerland. The Convention entered into force on 2 April 1938.

== Content ==
Article 1 of the Convention obligates the state parties to prohibit and stop any broadcast transmissions within their territories that are "of such a character as to incite the population of any territory to acts incompatible with the internal order or the security of a territory"; this article was intended to prohibit and stop propaganda from being broadcast that would incite listeners to revolution.

Article 2 of the Convention contains a similar mandate by prohibiting broadcasts that would constitute "incitement to war against another high contracting party". The Article makes no distinction between the speech of the state and the speech of private individuals.

Articles 3 and 4 prohibits the broadcasting of false news, and Article 5 states that parties to the agreement will, upon request, provide information to foreign broadcasting services that can be used to promote knowledge and understanding of the "civilization and conditions of life of his own country".

== History of legacy ==
Upon the outbreak of the Second World War, there were 22 parties to the Convention. The effect of the Convention was severely limited by the fact that Germany, Italy, and Japan‒states which waged extensive propaganda campaigns throughout the 1930s and World War II–were not parties to the Convention. Significantly, China, the United States, and the Soviet Union also chose to not ratify the Convention, the U.S. on First Amendment grounds.

After the Second World War, depositary functions for the Convention passed from the League of Nations to the United Nations. In 1954, the United Nations General Assembly recognised that the Convention "was an important element in the field of freedom of information". The General Assembly authorised the drafting of a Protocol which would supplement and update the Convention; however, when the draft Protocol attracted little support, the UN "abandoned all efforts at reviving the Convention".

Beginning in the 1960s, the Convention continued to be ratified by a few states, particularly those in the Communist bloc. However, during the 1980s, it was denounced by Australia, France, the Netherlands, and the United Kingdom. It was most recently ratified by Liberia in 2005. As of 2013, it is in force for 29 states.

== Signatories and state parties ==
The following states became parties to the Convention by ratifying, acceding to, or declaring succession to it. Parties that signed the Convention on 23 September 1936 are indicated in bold. Parties that have subsequently denounced the Convention are indicated and the date of ratification is in italics.

State	Ratification	Notes
Afghanistan	8 Feb 1985	
Australia	25 Jun 1937	At the time of ratification, extended the treaty to the Territory of New Guinea, the Territory of Papua, the Nauru Trust Territory, and Norfolk Island. Denounced the treaty for itself and the dependencies still under its control on 17 May 1985.
**Brazil**	11 Feb 1938	
Bulgaria	17 May 1972	
Cameroon	19 Jun 1967	Declared succession from extension to French Cameroons.
**Chile**	20 Feb 1940	
**Czechoslovakia**	18 Sep 1984	Ratification currently in force for no state.
**Denmark**	11 Oct 1937	Extends to Faroe Islands and Greenland.
**Egypt**	29 Jul 1938	
El Salvador	18 Aug 1938	Ratified as "Salvador".
**Estonia**	18 Aug 1938	
Finland	29 Nov 1938	
**France**	8 Mar 1938	On 14 Jan 1939, extended the treaty to all exclusively French colonies and protectorates and to territories under French mandate: Algeria, French Cameroons, Clipperton Island, Madagascar (including Comoros), French Equatorial Africa, Guadeloupe, French Guiana, French India, French Indochina, Martinique, Morocco, New Caledonia (including Wallis and Futuna), French Polynesia, Réunion, Saint Pierre and Miquelon, French Somaliland, Mandate for Syria and the Lebanon, French Togoland, Tunisia, and French West Africa . On 14 Jul 1939, extended the treaty to the Anglo-French condominium of New Hebrides. Denounced the treaty for itself and the dependencies still under its control on 13 Apr 1984.
East Germany	30 Aug 1984	Ratification is currently in force for no state.
Guatemala	18 Nov 1938	
Holy See	5 Jan 1967	
Hungary	20 Sep 1984	
**British India**	11 Aug 1937	Ratification is currently in force for the Republic of India.
Irish Free State	25 May 1938	
Laos	23 Mar 1966	
Latvia	25 Apr 1939	
Liberia	16 Sep 2005	
**Luxembourg**	8 Feb 1938	
Malta	1 Apr 1966	Declared succession from extension to Malta Colony.
Mauritius	18 Jul 1969	Declared succession from extension to British Mauritius.
Mongolia	10 Jul 1985	
**Netherlands**	15 Feb 1939	At the time of ratification, extended the treaty to the Dutch East Indies, Surinam, and Curaçao and Dependencies. Denounced the treaty for itself and the dependencies still under its control on 10 Oct 1982.
**New Zealand**	27 Jan 1938	
**Norway**	5 May 1938	
South Africa	30 Dec 1938	
**Soviet Union**	3 Feb 1983	Ratification currently applies to the Russian Federation.
Sweden	22 June 1938	
**Switzerland**	8 Feb 1938	
**United Kingdom**	18 Aug 1937	On 13 Oct 1937, extended the treaty to Burma. On 1 Nov 1937, extended it to Southern Rhodesia. On 14 Jul 1939, extended it to Colony of Aden, Bahamas, Barbados, Basutoland, Bechuanaland, Bermuda, British Guiana, British Honduras, Ceylon, Cyprus, Falkland Islands and Dependencies, Fiji, Gambia, Gibraltar, Gilbert and Ellice Islands, Gold Coast (including British Togoland), Hong Kong, Jamaica (including Turks and Caicos Islands and Cayman Islands), Kenya, Leeward Islands, Federated Malay States, Unfederated Malay States, Brunei, Malta, Mauritius, New Hebrides, Colony and Protectorate of Nigeria, British Cameroons, North Borneo, Northern Rhodesia, Nyasaland, Mandatory Palestine, Saint Helena and Ascension, Sarawak, Seychelles, Sierra Leone, British Somaliland, Straits Settlements, Swaziland, Tanganyika, Tonga, Transjordan, Trinidad and Tobago, Uganda, Windward Islands, and Zanzibar. Denounced the treaty for itself and the dependencies still under its control on 24 Jul 1985.
Zimbabwe	1 Dec 1998	Declared succession from extension to Southern Rhodesia.

The other states that signed the Convention but have not ratified it are Albania, Argentina, Austria, Belgium, Colombia, Dominican Republic, Greece, Lithuania, Mexico, Romania, Spain, Turkey, and Uruguay.
