= Eduardo Mace =

Brazilian businessman (born 1966)

Eduardo Mace (Elichirigoity), (born September 1966 in Brazil) is an Anglo-Brazilian entrepreneur, multimedia software pioneer, developer, editor and multimedia author. His multimedia businesses were active in Brazil from 1989 until 2013 and contributed to the formation of the digital media market, having developed - through his company ATR Multimedia - the first multimedia software available in Brazil (1990), the first reference CD-ROM with Almanaque Abril (Editora Abril) in 1994, the first Brazilian board and adventure games (Master Multimídia and Casseta & Planeta: Noite Animal) in 1995.

From 1994 to 1998 published over a hundred reference, children's, games and educational titles in CD-ROM. Founded in 1999 an educational internet portal, Edulink, in a failed initiative after the year 2000 due to the internet bubble crisis.

In 2001 and 2002 acted as advisor in digital literacy to the Brazilian Ministry of Culture with the task of coordinating the culture related works of a US$1.2 billion government fund called FUST (Fundo de Universalização dos Serviços de Telecomunicações), that supported the digital inclusion of public libraries, museums and schools through the donation of equipment, installation of computer labs and digital competency training in partnership with the Ministry of Science and Technology and the Ministry of Education.

From 2003 on through his company Log On (merged with ATR Multimedia in 1998), re-packaged and distributed important video catalogues from Brazil (TV Cultura), US (History Channel, National Geographic) and UK (BBC and Channel 4). Brought new standards to the home video market across Latin America publishing over three thousand new titles in Brazil and Mexico, and especially in preschool titles because of their new formats like the MiniDVD and the DVDBook, making Log On one of the main distributors of the region from 2009 to 2012.

Log On in 2009 launched, as DX Kids, one of the first SVOD (subscription video on demand) platforms, a kid SaaS product, that in 2010 became known as Clube DXTV.

== Platforms ==
In 2008 invented, developed and patented the audiovisual browser called DX that adopted the user experience of television, with videos constantly playing as in a TV signal, with an internal videos navigation. DX became in 2011 a platform for the distribution of on demand video mixed with live feeds, and was adopted by Turner (Esporte Interativo) in Brazil and SBT (Brazil's second largest broadcaster) in the international markets.

In 2014 wrote several papers with practical uses of complex network theories for the internet. During that year helped develop and build platform-based startups with attached digital marketplaces for several mobile technology segments, in partnership with Brazilian and American companies.

In early 2017 moved to the United States to work with international startups in their go-to-market efforts and with Fortune 500 companies to drive their digital transformation.
