= Emanuel Araújo =

Brazilian historian (1942–2000)

- Born: 24 December 1942; Santo Amaro, Bahia, Brazil
- Died: 15 July 2000 (aged 57); Brasília, Federal District, Brazil
- Occupations: Historian, editor, professor

Emanuel Oliveira de Araújo (24 December 1942 – 15 July 2000) was a Brazilian historian and editor.

== Life and career ==
Araújo was born in Santo Amaro, Bahia. He taught history at the University of Brasília from 1968 to 1971, when he was removed for political reasons, and again from 1989 to his death in Brasília in 2000. In 1995 he was promoted to full professor; after his death, his colleagues successfully petitioned for him to be named professor emeritus.

At the University of Brasília, he played an important role in the teaching of ancient history, assisted by knowledge of all the major languages of the ancient world: Latin, Hebrew, Ancient Greek, and Old Egyptian. He also researched and taught the colonial history of Brazil.

Araújo also worked as an editor, including at the Fundação Getulio Vargas, the National Archives, and Bloch Editores. He was a co-editor of the Enciclopédia Mirador Internacional and the Enciclopédia Ilustrada do Brasil and published collections of documents. His A construção do livro – Princípios da técnica de editoração ("Construction of the Book: Principles of Editorial Technique"), published in 1986, was influential, and he was head of the University of Brasília Press in 1992 and 1993 and then served on its editorial board until his death.

== Selected publications ==
- (1970) O êxodo hebreu: raizes histórico-sociais da unidade judaica
- (1986) A construção do livro: princípios da técnica de editoração
- (1993) O Teatro dos Vícios: transgressão e transigência na sociedade urbana colonial
- (2000) Escrito para a Eternidade: a literatura no Egito Faraônico
