= Maua albigutta =

Scientific classification
- Kingdom: Animalia
- Phylum: Arthropoda
- Clade: Pancrustacea
- Class: Insecta
- Order: Hemiptera
- Suborder: Auchenorrhyncha
- Family: Cicadidae
- Genus: Maua
- Species: M. albigutta

Binomial name
- Maua albigutta (Walker, 1856)

Species of true bug

Maua albigutta is a cicada species that is widely distributed in Sumatra and Peninsular Malaysia and has been recorded once from Borneo
