= Grêmio Esportivo Mauaense =

Association football club in Brazil

Mauaense
- Full name: Grêmio Esportivo Mauaense
- Nickname(s): Locomotiva do ABC (Locomotive of the ABC)
- Founded: 15 December 1981; 43 years ago
- Stadium: Pedro Benedetti
- Capacity: 11,986
- President: Marco Antonio Capuano
- Head coach: Luiz Carlos Cavalheiro
- League: Campeonato Paulista Segunda Divisão
- 2024: Paulista Segunda Divisão, 11th of 17
Home colors	Away colors

Grêmio Esportivo Mauaense, commonly known as Mauaense, is a Brazilian football club based in Mauá, São Paulo state. It currently plays the Campeonato Paulista Segunda Divisão, the fourth tier of the São Paulo state league. The club was founded in 1981 and spent most of its history in the bottom tiers of the Campeonato Paulista, and has never qualified for the Campeonato Brasileiro. Known as the Locomotiva due to Mauá's status as a railway town, Mauaense had its best seasons from 1985 to 1987, when the club won the Campeonato Paulista Série A3 and played in the second division of the Paulistão for two consecutive years.

Their home ground is Pedro Benedetti Stadium, which has a maximum capacity of 11,986, although only up to 8,567 fans are allowed in by the Military Firefighters Corps.

== History ==
The club was founded on December 15, 1981. They won the Campeonato Paulista Série A3 in 1985, and the Campeonato Paulista Segunda Divisão in 2003.

== Achievements ==
- Campeonato Paulista Série A3:
  - Winners (1): 1985
- Campeonato Paulista Série A4:
  - Winners (1): 2003

== Stadium ==
Grêmio Esportivo Mauaense play their home games at Estádio Pedro Benedetti. The stadium has a maximum capacity of 11,986 people.
