= Maua (cicada) =

- Maua quadrituberculata

Scientific classification
- Kingdom: Animalia
- Phylum: Arthropoda
- Class: Insecta
- Order: Hemiptera
- Suborder: Auchenorrhyncha
- Family: Cicadidae
- Subfamily: Cicadinae
- Tribe: Leptopsaltriini
- Subtribe: Puranina
- Genus: Maua; Distant, 1905

Species
- See text

Genus of true bugs

Maua is a genus of cicadas from Southeast Asia. The males possess two pairs of dark ventral abdominal tubercles on third and fourth sternites.

In 2000, Kos and Gogala expressed the opinion that it was likely that the Maua as it was then constructed was interlineated with the genus Purana as the criteria used by Distant in separating them were not reflective of the phylogenetic relations of the species included. In 2010, Lee and Hill redefined the Cicadini subtribe Leptopsaltriina Moulton, 1923, as well as a number of other relationships in the Asian Cicadidae, placing both Maua and Purana in Leptopsaltriina, along with several other genera.

== Species ==
The World Auchenorrhyncha Database includes:

1. Maua affinis Distant, 1905
2. Maua albigutta (Walker, 1857)
3. Maua albistigma (Walker, 1850)
4. Maua borneensis Duffels, 2009
5. Maua latilinea (Walker, 1868)
6. Maua linggana Moulton, 1923
7. Maua palawanensis Duffels, 2009
8. Maua philippinensis Schmidt, 1924
9. Maua platygaster Ashton, 1911
10. Maua quadrituberculata (Signoret, 1847)
11. Maua squeala Wang, Duffels & Wei, 2021
