= Theolinda Olympio de Araújo =

Brazilian politician

Theolinda Olympio de Araújo was a Brazilian politician. She contested the October 14, 1934 elections to the State Constitutive Assembly of Ceará as a candidate of the Catholic Electoral League. She was the sole woman getting elected, gaining the position as a replacer in the assembly. In total five female candidates had contested.
