= Multilateral foreign policy of the Holy See =

Foreign policy of the governing body of the Catholic Church

The multilateral foreign policy of the Holy See is particularly active on some issues, such as human rights, disarmament, and economic and social development, which are dealt with in international fora.

== Right to life ==
Both at the United Nations and at the various international conferences, the Holy See has promoted the "Culture of life", opposing efforts to legalize or endorse abortion and euthanasia through internationally legally binding instruments or non-binding declarations, advocating for the abolition of death penalty at the global level, and seeking to ban research on human embryos. At the United Nations General Assembly, the Holy See stated that:

The right to life and respect for human dignity remains an inalienable right of every person and a founding principle of this Organization. It is therefore the duty of States to promote and protect this right from conception until natural death. To that end, we must work consistently to reverse the culture of death embraced by some social and legal structures which justify certain forms of destruction of life as a legal necessity or a medical service.

=== Human cloning ===
At the international level, the Holy See has underlined the ethical problems raised by some current forms of biomedical research. The Holy See has been particularly active in the area of human cloning. In 2001, when Germany and France proposed at the United Nations General Assembly the adoption of an international convention to ban reproductive human cloning, the Holy See, together with a coalition of like-minded states that included Spain, Philippines, the United States, and Costa Rica, noted that such a convention would implicitly legitimize the cloning of human beings for research purposes, which is more serious from an ethical point of view than the reproductive one, and proposed banning all forms of human cloning. The Holy See objected to the "production of millions of human embryos with the intention of destroying them as part of the process of using them for scientific research" and to the instrumentalization and victimization of women, specially of the poorest women, in the process of harvesting the necessary human eggs. These efforts lead to the successful adoption, in March 2005, of a United Nations Declaration on Human Cloning, which calls upon all member states of the UN "to prohibit all forms of human cloning inasmuch as they are incompatible with human dignity and the protection of human life".

=== Death penalty ===
In 2007, the Holy See argued at the United Nations that the death penalty should be used exceptionally, only when its use is necessary to protect society against an aggressor, a situation which is "practically non-existent" today, since societies have other ways of protecting their citizens. In addition, it noted that capital punishment is frequently discriminatory, since it is imposed most often on the poorest and on members of religious, ethnic and racial minorities; and that it is irreversible, since it excludes all possibilities of recourse and restoration in the event of a miscarriage of justice. Consequently, the Holy See worked for the adoption of a UN moratorium on the death penalty.

== Freedom of conscience and religion ==
Following Vatican Council II, the Holy See has uphold, at the international level, the centrality of the freedom of conscience and religion among all Human Rights since, in its view, those freedoms impinge on essence of the Human person. Pope Benedict XVI noted that "religious freedom expresses what is unique about the human person, for it allows us to direct our personal and social life to God, in whose light the identity, meaning and purpose of the person are fully understood. To deny or arbitrarily restrict this freedom is to foster a reductive vision of the human person; to eclipse the public role of religion is to create a society which is unjust, inasmuch as it fails to take account of the true nature of the human person; it is to stifle the growth of the authentic and lasting peace of the whole human family." Thus, the respect for freedom of religion is at the basis of the respect for all other human rights. Consequently, the Holy See has called upon States to comply with their international commitments to respect those rights. It has stated:

Recognition of the dignity of each and every person, which the Human Rights Council was formed to protect and promote, entails full respect for the inner and transcendent dimension of the human person, which is an integral part of what it means to be a human being. Through the free exercise of conscience and moral decision making, human beings are able to transform themselves into living members of social life whose good will, charity and hope promote the dignity and wellbeing of every member of the human family. Intrinsically linked to freedom of conscience is the freedom of religion by which human beings are able to pursue the most important relationship of their life, that is, their relationship with God. Freedom of religion necessarily entails the freedom to ascribe to a set of beliefs, to adopt or change one’s religion, to profess one’s faith and to practice fully that faith openly and publicly. Governments have a solemn responsibility to safeguard rather than ridicule this inalienable right. Since the State is not the author of any fundamental human right, it must respect that intimate and fundamental sanctuary of human freedom, the conscience, and to allow each conscience its fullest and highest expression in the free exercise of religious faith.

In parallel, the Holy See condemns the violation to the freedom of religion, specially when suffered by Christians:

It is painful to think that in some areas of the world it is impossible to profess one’s religion freely except at the risk of life and personal liberty. In other areas we see more subtle and sophisticated forms of prejudice and hostility towards believers and religious symbols. At present, Christians are the religious group which suffers most from persecution on account of its faith. Many Christians experience daily affronts and often live in fear because of their pursuit of truth, their faith in Jesus Christ and their heartfelt plea for respect for religious freedom. This situation is unacceptable, since it represents an insult to God and to human dignity; furthermore, it is a threat to security and peace, and an obstacle to the achievement of authentic and integral human development.

In this context, the Holy See has stressed the duty of both governments and private individuals "to promote tolerance, mutual understanding and respect among the followers of the various faith traditions." At the same time, the Holy See has condemned religious fanaticism and violence as a prevention of the freedom of religion, as well as "every form of hostility to religion that would restrict the public role of believers in civil and political life."

== Sexual and reproductive rights ==
Faced with a coordinated effort to incorporate sexual and reproductive rights within the body of internationally recognized human rights, the Holy See has become the major advocate at the international level of traditional sexual mores and marriage.

=== Traditional family ===
At the various international conferences, the Holy See argued that the traditional family, based on a stable and loving relationship between a man and a woman, is necessary for the responsible transmission and nurturing of new life. Consequently, society must recognize the traditional family's contribution to society's own good through appropriate cultural, fiscal and social policy. At the 1994 Cairo Conference, the Holy See argued that global population policy should ultimately be guided by the Respect for life and for the dignity of the human person so as to “foster the family based on marriage and must sustain parents, fathers and mothers, in their mutual and responsible decisions with regard to the procreation and education of children.” Conversely, the Holy See has opposed “any attempts to weaken the family or to propose a radical redefining of its structure, such as assigning the status of family to other life-style forms.”

=== Sexual orientation ===
In particular, the Holy See has opposed the use of the terms “Sexual orientation” and “Gender identity” in international human rights instruments, since, due to the fact that there is no agreed definition of those terms in international law, their use could favor of a redefinition of the family. In its view, the term gender, whenever used, should be understood as male and female as grounded on the biological sexual identity. On these bases, in 2008, the Holy See opposed the adoption of a proposed declaration on sexual orientation and gender identity by the United Nations General Assembly. At the same time, the Holy See has condemned all forms of violence against homosexual persons and has called for the elimination of criminal penalties against them.

=== Responsible sexual behavior ===
The Holy See condemned irresponsible sexual behavior, which, in its view, victimizes mostly women and children, and which is fostered by today's “attitudes of sexual permissiveness, which focus above all on personal pleasure and gratification.” It has further argued that traditional sexual mores are the best way to prevent Sexually transmitted diseases including AIDS. As Archbishop Javier Lozano Barragán, “health minister“ of the Holy See stated at a UN special session on AIDS:

Regarding the sexual transmission of the disease, the best and most effective prevention is training in the authentic values of life, love and sexuality. A proper appreciation of these values will inform today's men and women about how to attain full personal fulfillment through affective maturity and the proper use of sexuality, whereby couples remain faithful to each other and behave in a way that keeps them from becoming infected by HIV/AIDS. No one can deny that sexual license increases the danger of contracting the disease. It is in this context that the values of matrimonial fidelity and of chastity and abstinence can be better understood.

In the same vein, during his 2009 trip to Africa, Pope Benedict XVI argued that the spread of AIDS “cannot be overcome by the distribution of prophylactics: on the contrary, they increase it. The solution must have two elements: firstly, bringing out the human dimension of sexuality, that is to say a spiritual and human renewal that would bring with it a new way of behaving towards others, and secondly, true friendship offered above all to those who are suffering, a willingness to make sacrifices and to practise self-denial, to be alongside the suffering."

=== Family planning ===
The Holy See underlined that responsible parenthood entails responsibility and demands discipline and self-restrain, particularly in the area of sexual behavior. The Holy See opposed efforts to endorse Family planning methods which separate what, in its view, are the two essential dimensions of human sexuality: the transmission of life and the loving care of parents. At the Cairo Conference, the Holy See opposed the term family planning services which encompass sterilization, since it was often abused, especially when promoted among the poor or the illiterate. At the conclusion of the 1995 Beijing Conference on Women, the Holy See reiterated that use of the term widest range of family planning services should not be interpreted as endorsing family planning methods or services that it considers morally unacceptable, that do not respect the liberty of spouses, human dignity or the human rights of those concerned.In particular, it could not be understood as endorsing contraception or the use of Condoms, either as a family planning measure or in HIV/AIDS prevention. In addition, the Holy See argued the education of children and adolescents, including in the area of sexual behavior, is primordially the responsibility of their parents, and not of the State; and it urged the international community to guarantee the parents the full exercise of this rights and to assist them to carry out their responsibilities.

== See also ==
- Holy See and the United Nations
- Foreign relations of the Holy See
- Legal status of the Holy See
- Catholic social teaching
- Social teachings of the papacy
