= Antônio de Araújo =

Brazilian Jesuit missionary

Antônio de Araújo (1566–1632) was a Brazilian Jesuit missionary.

Araújo was born at St. Michael's in the Azores. He entered the Society of Jesus in Bahia, and was for nine years Superior of the Missions of Brazil. He edited for publication in 1618 a catechism in the Old Tupi language of Brazil, the Catechism in the Brasílica Language. Nathanael Southwell says of it:

"This catechism, begun by others in Brazilian, he augmented considerably. It was published at Lisbon under his name, and is regarded as without a superior in the catechetical art. It was afterwards translated into the native American tongue."

The 1686 edition was entitled Catecismo brasilico da doutrina Christãa.
