= Robert Araujo =

The Reverend Robert John Araujo
- Born: 30 October 1948
- Died: 21 October 2015 (aged 66); Campion Center, Massachusetts.
- Education: Georgetown University (BA, JD); Weston Jesuit School of Theology (MDiv, STL); Columbia University (LLM, JSD); Oxford University (BCL)
- Occupation: Professor of Law

Robert John Araujo, SJ (October 30, 1948 – October 21, 2015), was the John Courtney Murray Professor at Loyola University Chicago School of Law. Formerly, he was the Robert Bellarmine University Professor in American and Public International Law at Gonzaga University School of Law (1994–2005) and an Ordinary Professor at the Pontifical Gregorian University in Rome (2005–2008).

== Biography ==
He was a visiting professor at Georgetown University Law Center, Saint Louis University School of Law, Boston College School of Law, and Fordham University Law School. He had an A.B.and a J.D. from Georgetown University; a M. Div. and a S.T.L. from the Weston Jesuit School of Theology; an LL.M. and a J.S.D. from Columbia University; and a B.C.L. from Oxford University.

Beginning in 1996, he was an advisor to the Holy See providing counsel on public international law, in that capacity, he was a delegate to United Nations General Assembly, to the 1998 Rome Conference on the establishment of the International Criminal Court and to the negotiation of the United Nations Declaration banning all forms of Human Cloning.

He entered the Society of Jesus in 1986.

== Publications ==
- Araujo, Robert and Lucal, John, Papal Diplomacy and the Quest for Peace, the Vatican and International Organizations from the early years to the League of Nations, Sapienza Press (2004).
- Araujo, Robert and Lucal, John, Papal Diplomacy and the Quest for Peace: The United Nations from Pius XII to Paul VI, Saint Joseph's University Press (2013).
- Araujo, Robert John, "The International Personality and Sovereignty of the Holy See," 50 Catholic University Law Review 291 (2001).
- Araujo, Robert John, "John Paul II and the Rule of Law: Bringing Order to International Disorder," 45 Journal of Catholic Legal Studies 293-320 (2006).
- Araujo, Robert John,"The Role of International Law in US Constitutional Law - A question that might be posed by John Courtney Murray: Is it really law?," 4 Journal of Catholic Social Thought 35 - 58 (2007).
- Araujo, Robert John, "The UN Declaration on Human Cloning: a survey and assessment of the debate," 7 The National Catholic Bioethics Quarterly 129 - 149 (2007).
- Robert J. Araujo, S.J., “Anti-Personnel Mines and Peremptory Norms of International Law: Argument and Catalyst“, 1 Gonzaga Journal of International Law (1997–98).
- Robert Araujo, “Conscience Protection and the Holy See,” 1 Ave Maria International Law Journal 1, 23 (2009).
- Robert Araujo, “The Catholic Neo-Scholastic Contribution to Human Rights: The Natural Law Foundation,” 1 Ave Maria Law Review 1, 159-174 (2003).
- Robert Araujo, “John Paul II--A Man of God and a Servant of Man: The Pope at the United Nations” 5 Ave Maria Law Review 2, 367-398 (2007).
