= Frana Araujo Mace =

American politician (1934–2015)

Frana Araujo Mace (born Frana Araujo; June 4, 1934 – March 26, 2015, aged 80) was an American politician. She was a Democratic state legislator in district 4 of Colorado, serving for four terms.

== Biography ==
She was the daughter of Frank and Mary Araujo. She graduated from West High School. She was married to Gil Mace for 53 years, and had four children. Araujo Mace lived in Denver, Colorado.

She was appointed to a fill a vacancy in the Colorado House in 1995, and was elected in 1996, 1998 and 2000. Araujo Mace proposed a bill restricting cruising in 1998.
