= Hokkaido Museum of Modern Art =

- 北海道立近代美術館
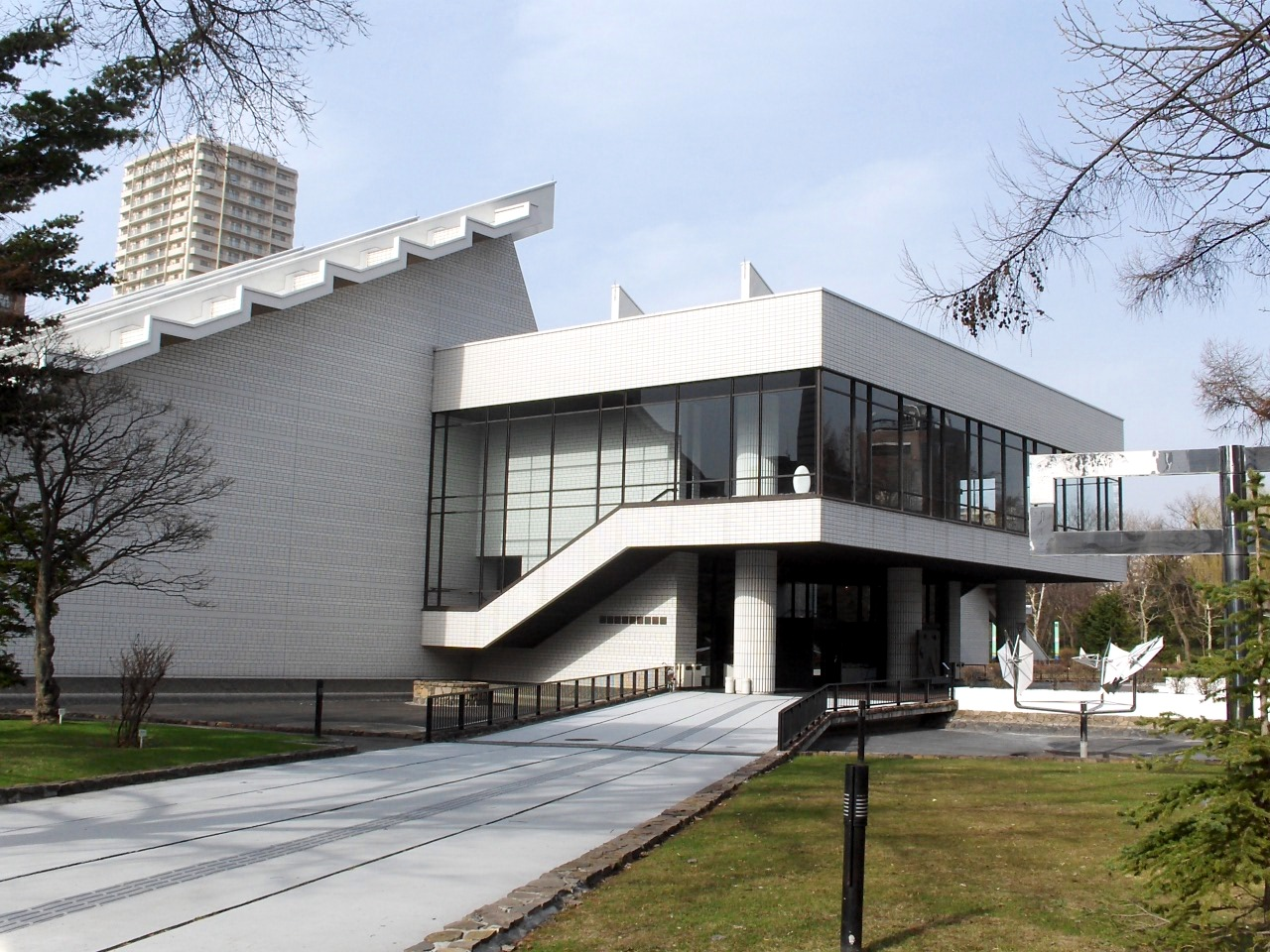
- Interactive map of the Hokkaido Museum of Modern Art area

General information
- Location: Kita 1, Nishi 17, Chūō-ku, Sapporo, Hokkaidō, Japan
- Coordinates: 43°03′37″N 141°19′50″E
- Opened: July 1977

Website
- artmuseum.pref.hokkaido.lg.jp/knb

The Hokkaido Museum of Modern Art (北海道立近代美術館, Hokkaidō-ritsu Kindai Bijutsukan) opened in Sapporo, Hokkaidō, Japan in 1977. The collection includes works by Jules Pascin and the École de Paris as well as by modern Japanese artists, in particular those with a connection to Hokkaidō.

There are five related prefectural art museums elsewhere in Sapporo and Hokkaidō: Migishi Kōtarō Museum of Art, Hokkaido, Hakodate Museum of Art, Hokkaido, Hokkaido Asahikawa Museum of Art, Hokkaido Obihiro Museum of Art, and Kushiro Art Museum, Hokkaido.

== See also ==
- List of Cultural Properties of Japan - paintings (Hokkaidō)
- List of Historic Sites of Japan (Hokkaidō)
- Hokkaido Museum
