= List of parties to the Convention on Certain Conventional Weapons =

Participation in the Convention on Certain Conventional Weapons: Signed and ratified Acceded or succeeded / Accepted Only signed

The list of parties to the Convention on Certain Conventional Weapons encompasses the states who have signed and ratified or acceded to the international agreement prohibiting or restricting the use of certain conventional weapons which may be deemed to be excessively injurious or have indiscriminate effects.

On April 10, 1981, the Convention on Certain Conventional Weapons (CCWC) was opened for signature. Mexico became the first state to deposit the treaty on February 11, 1982. The treaty came into force on December 2, 1983. Since April 10, 1982, states that did not sign the treaty can now only accede to it. The instrument of ratification, accession, or succession is deposited with the Secretary-General of the United Nations.

As of July 2024, 128 states have ratified or acceded to the treaty, the most recent being Singapore on September 21, 2023. Four states have signed but not ratified the treaty.

== Ratified or acceded states ==
| State | Signed | Deposited | Method | PI | PII | PIII | PIV | PV |
|---|---|---|---|---|---|---|---|---|
| Afghanistan | April 10, 1981 | August 9, 2017 | Ratification | X | X | X | X | X |
| Albania | | August 28, 2002 | Accession | X | X | X | X | X |
| Algeria | | May 6, 2015 | Accession | X | | X | X | |
| Antigua and Barbuda | | August 23, 2010 | Accession | X | | X | X | |
| Argentina | December 2, 1981 | October 2, 1995 | Ratification | X | X | X | X | X |
| Australia | April 8, 1982 | September 29, 1983 | Ratification | X | X | X | X | X |
| Austria | April 10, 1981 | March 14, 1983 | Ratification | X | X | X | X | X |
| Bahrain | | March 11, 2016 | Accession | | | X | X | X |
| Bangladesh | | September 6, 2000 | Accession | X | X | X | X | X |
| Belarus | April 10, 1981 | June 23, 1982 | Ratification as Byelorussian SSR | X | X | X | X | X |
| Belgium | April 10, 1981 | February 7, 1995 | Ratification | X | X | X | X | X |
| Benin | | March 27, 1989 | Accession | X | | X | | |
| Bolivia | | September 21, 2001 | Accession | X | X | X | X | |
| Bosnia and Herzegovina | | September 1, 1993 | Succession from Yugoslavia | X | X | X | X | X |
| Brazil | | October 3, 1995 | Accession | X | X | X | X | X |
| Bulgaria | April 10, 1981 | October 15, 1982 | Ratification | X | X | X | X | X |
| Burkina Faso | | November 26, 2003 | Accession | X | X | X | X | X |
| Burundi | | July 13, 2012 | Accession | | X | | | X |
| Cambodia | | March 25, 1997 | Accession | X | X | X | X | |
| Cameroon | | December 7, 2006 | Accession | | X | | X | X |
| Canada | April 10, 1981 | June 24, 1994 | Ratification | X | X | X | X | X |
| Cape Verde | | September 16, 1997 | Accession | X | X | X | X | |
| Chile | | October 15, 2003 | Acceptance | X | X | X | X | X |
| China | September 14, 1981 | April 7, 1982 | Ratification | X | X | X | X | X |
| Colombia | | March 6, 2000 | Accession | X | X | X | X | |
| Costa Rica | | December 17, 1998 | Accession | X | X | X | X | X |
| Croatia | | December 2, 1993 | Succession from Yugoslavia | X | X | X | X | X |
| Cuba | April 10, 1981 | March 2, 1987 | Ratification | X | X | X | X | X |
| Cyprus | | December 12, 1988 | Accession | X | X | X | X | X |
| Czech Republic | | February 22, 1993 | Succession from Czechoslovakia; Signed April 10, 1981; Ratified August 31, 1982 | X | X | X | X | X |
| Denmark | April 10, 1981 | July 7, 1982 | Ratification (extends to the Faroe Islands and Greenland) | X | X | X | X | X |
| Djibouti | | July 29, 1996 | Accession | X | X | X | | |
| Dominican Republic | | June 21, 2010 | Accession | X | X | X | X | X |
| Ecuador | September 9, 1981 | May 4, 1982 | Ratification | X | X | X | X | X |
| El Salvador | | January 26, 2000 | Accession | X | X | X | X | X |
| Estonia | | April 20, 2000 | Accession | X | X | X | X | X |
| Finland | April 10, 1981 | April 8, 1982 | Ratification | X | X | X | X | X |
| France | April 10, 1981 | March 4, 1988 | Ratification | X | X | X | X | X |
| Gabon | | October 1, 2007 | Accession | X | X | X | X | X |
| Georgia | | April 29, 1996 | Accession | X | X | X | X | X |
| Germany | April 10, 1981 | November 25, 1992 | Ratification; Also East Germany; Signed April 10, 1981; Ratified July 20, 1982 | X | X | X | X | X |
| Greece | April 10, 1981 | January 28, 1992 | Ratification | X | X | X | X | X |
| Grenada | | December 10, 2014 | Accession | X | | X | X | X |
| Guatemala | | July 21, 1983 | Accession | X | X | X | X | X |
| Guinea-Bissau | | August 6, 2008 | Accession | X | X | X | X | X |
| Holy See | | July 22, 1997 | Accession | X | X | X | X | X |
| Honduras | | October 30, 2003 | Accession | X | X | X | X | X |
| Hungary | April 10, 1981 | June 14, 1982 | Ratification | X | X | X | X | X |
| Iceland | April 10, 1981 | August 22, 2008 | Ratification | X | X | X | X | X |
| India | May 15, 1981 | March 1, 1984 | Ratification | X | X | X | X | X |
| Iraq | | September 24, 2014 | Accession | | X | | X | X |
| Ireland | April 10, 1981 | March 13, 1995 | Ratification | X | X | X | X | X |
| Israel | | March 22, 1995 | Accession | X | X | | X | |
| Italy | April 10, 1981 | January 20, 1995 | Ratification | X | X | X | X | X |
| Ivory Coast | | May 25, 2016 | Accession | | X | | | X |
| Jamaica | | September 25, 2008 | Accession | X | X | X | X | X |
| Japan | September 22, 1981 | June 9, 1982 | Acceptance | X | X | X | X | |
| Jordan | | October 19, 1995 | Accession | X | X | X | | |
| Kazakhstan | | July 8, 2009 | Accession | X | | X | X | |
| Kuwait | | May 24, 2013 | Accession | X | X | X | X | X |
| Laos | | January 3, 1983 | Accession | X | X | X | | X |
| Latvia | | January 4, 1993 | Accession | X | X | X | X | X |
| Lebanon | | April 5, 2017 | Accession | X | X | X | | |
| Lesotho | | September 6, 2000 | Accession | X | X | X | X | X |
| Liberia | | September 16, 2005 | Accession | X | X | X | X | X |
| Liechtenstein | February 11, 1982 | August 16, 1989 | Ratification | X | X | X | X | X |
| Lithuania | | June 3, 1998 | Accession | X | X | X | X | X |
| Luxembourg | April 10, 1981 | May 21, 1996 | Ratification | X | X | X | X | X |
| Madagascar | | March 14, 2008 | Accession | X | X | X | X | X |
| Maldives | | September 7, 2000 | Accession | X | X | X | X | |
| Malawi | | September 23, 2022 | Accession | X | X | | | |
| Mali | | October 24, 2001 | Accession | X | X | X | X | X |
| Malta | | June 26, 1995 | Accession | X | X | X | X | X |
| Mauritius | | May 6, 1996 | Accession | X | X | X | X | |
| Mexico | April 10, 1981 | February 11, 1982 | Ratification | X | X | X | X | |
| Moldova | | September 8, 2000 | Accession | X | X | X | | |
| Monaco | | August 12, 1997 | Accession | X | X | | | |
| Mongolia | April 10, 1981 | June 8, 1982 | Ratification | X | X | X | X | |
| Montenegro | | October 23, 2006 | Succession from Serbia and Montenegro | X | X | X | X | X |
| Morocco | April 10, 1981 | March 19, 2002 | Ratification | | X | | X | |
| Nauru | | November 12, 2001 | Accession | X | X | X | X | |
| Netherlands | April 10, 1981 | June 18, 1987 | Acceptance (initially for the Kingdom in Europe; in 2014 extended to the Caribbean Netherlands) | X | X | X | X | X |
| New Zealand | April 10, 1981 | October 18, 1993 | Ratification | X | X | X | X | X |
| Nicaragua | May 20, 1981 | December 5, 2000 | Ratification | X | X | X | X | X |
| Niger | | November 10, 1992 | Accession | X | X | X | X | X |
| North Macedonia | | December 30, 1996 | Succession from Yugoslavia | X | X | X | X | X |
| Norway | April 10, 1981 | June 7, 1983 | Ratification | X | X | X | X | X |
| Palestine | | January 5, 2015 | Accession | X | | X | | |
| Pakistan | January 26, 1982 | April 1, 1985 | Ratification | X | X | X | X | X |
| Panama | | March 26, 1997 | Accession | X | X | X | X | X |
| Paraguay | | September 22, 2004 | Accession | X | X | X | X | X |
| Peru | | July 3, 1997 | Accession | X | X | X | X | X |
| Philippines | May 15, 1981 | July 15, 1996 | Ratification | X | X | X | X | X |
| Poland | April 10, 1981 | June 2, 1983 | Ratification | X | X | X | X | X |
| Portugal | April 10, 1981 | April 4, 1997 | Ratification | X | X | X | X | X |
| Qatar | | November 16, 2009 | Accession | X | | X | X | X |
| Romania | April 8, 1982 | July 26, 1995 | Ratification | X | X | X | X | X |
| Russia | April 10, 1981 | June 10, 1982 | Ratification as Soviet Union | X | X | X | X | X |
| Saudi Arabia | | December 7, 2007 | Accession | X | | X | X | X |
| Senegal | | November 29, 1999 | Accession | | X | X | | X |
| Serbia | | March 12, 2001 | Succession from Yugoslavia | X | X | X | X | |
| Seychelles | | June 8, 2000 | Accession | X | X | X | X | |
| Sierra Leone | May 1, 1981 | September 30, 2004 | Ratification | X | X | X | X | X |
| Singapore | | September 21, 2023 | Accession | X | | X | X | |
| Slovakia | | May 28, 1993 | Succession from Czechoslovakia; Signed April 10, 1981; Ratified August 31, 1982 | X | X | X | X | X |
| Slovenia | | July 6, 1992 | Succession from Yugoslavia | X | X | X | X | X |
| South Africa | | September 13, 1995 | Accession | X | X | X | X | X |
| South Korea | | May 9, 2001 | Accession | X | X | | | X |
| Spain | April 10, 1981 | December 29, 1993 | Ratification | X | X | X | X | X |
| Sri Lanka | | September 24, 2004 | Accession | X | X | X | X | |
| Saint Vincent and the Grenadines | | December 6, 2010 | Accession | X | X | X | X | X |
| Sweden | April 10, 1981 | July 7, 1982 | Ratification | X | X | X | X | X |
| Switzerland | June 18, 1981 | August 20, 1982 | Ratification | X | X | X | X | X |
| Tajikistan | | October 12, 1999 | Accession | X | X | X | X | X |
| Togo | September 15, 1981 | December 4, 1995 | Acceptance | X | X | X | | |
| Trinidad and Tobago | | July 29, 2024 | Accession | X | X | X | X | X |
| Tunisia | | May 15, 1987 | Accession | X | X | X | X | X |
| Turkey | March 26, 1982 | March 2, 2005 | Ratification | X | X | | X | |
| Turkmenistan | | March 19, 2004 | Accession | X | X | | | X |
| Uganda | | November 14, 1995 | Accession | X | X | X | | |
| Ukraine | April 10, 1981 | June 23, 1982 | Ratification as Ukrainian SSR | X | X | X | X | X |
| United Arab Emirates | | February 26, 2009 | Accession | X | | X | | X |
| United Kingdom | April 10, 1981 | February 13, 1995 | Ratification | X | X | X | X | |
| United States | April 8, 1982 | March 24, 1995 | Ratification | X | X | X | X | X |
| Uruguay | | October 6, 1994 | Accession | X | X | X | X | X |
| Uzbekistan | | September 29, 1997 | Accession | X | X | X | X | |
| Venezuela | | April 19, 2005 | Accession | X | X | X | | |
| Zambia | | September 25, 2013 | Accession | X | X | X | | X |

== Signatory states ==
The following four states have signed but not ratified the Convention.

| State | Signed |
|---|---|
| Egypt | April 10, 1981 |
| Nigeria | January 26, 1982 |
| Sudan | April 10, 1981 |
| Vietnam | April 10, 1981 |

== Non-signatory states ==
- Andorra
- Angola
- Armenia
- Azerbaijan
- Bahamas
- Barbados
- Belize
- Bhutan
- Botswana
- Brunei
- Central African Republic
- Chad
- Comoros
- Democratic Republic of the Congo
- Republic of the Congo
- Dominica
- Equatorial Guinea
- Eritrea
- Ethiopia
- Fiji
- Gambia
- Ghana
- Guinea
- Guyana
- Haiti
- Indonesia
- Iran
- Kenya
- Kiribati
- Kyrgyzstan
- Libya
- Malaysia
- Marshall Islands
- Mauritania
- Federated States of Micronesia
- Mozambique
- Myanmar
- Namibia
- Nepal
- North Korea
- Oman
- Palau
- Rwanda
- Saint Kitts and Nevis
- Saint Lucia
- Samoa
- Sao Tome and Principe
- Solomon Islands
- Somalia
- South Sudan
- Suriname
- Swaziland
- Syria
- Taiwan
- Tanzania
- Thailand
- Tonga
- Tuvalu
- Vanuatu
- Yemen
- Zimbabwe

== See also ==
- List of parties to the Biological Weapons Convention
- List of parties to the Chemical Weapons Convention
- List of parties to the Comprehensive Nuclear-Test-Ban Treaty
- List of parties to the Treaty on the Non-Proliferation of Nuclear Weapons
- List of parties to the Treaty on the Prohibition of Nuclear Weapons
- List of parties to the Ottawa Treaty
- List of parties to the Partial Nuclear Test Ban Treaty
