= List of parties to the Treaty on the Non-Proliferation of Nuclear Weapons =

Participation in the Nuclear Non-Proliferation Treaty: Recognized nuclear-weapon state ratifiers Recognized nuclear weapon state acceders Other ratifiers Other acceders or succeeders / Acceder which announced its withdrawal (North Korea) Non-signatories Partially recognized state which ratified (Republic of China)

The list of parties to the Nuclear Non-Proliferation Treaty encompasses the states which have signed and ratified or acceded to the international agreement limiting the spread of nuclear weapons.

On 1 July 1968, the Nuclear Non-Proliferation Treaty (NPT) was opened for signature. The three depositary states were the Soviet Union (and later its successor state Russia), the United Kingdom, the United States; states wishing to become a party to the NPT must deposit their instruments of ratification, accession or succession with at least one of the depositary governments. The treaty came into force and closed for signature on 5 March 1970 with the deposit of ratification of the three depositary states and 40 others. Since then, states that did not sign the treaty may only accede to it.

Date NPT first effective (including USSR, YU, CS of that time) 1st decade: ratified or acceded 1968–1977 2nd decade: ratified or acceded 1978–1987 3rd decade: ratified or acceded since 1988 Never signed (India, Israel, Pakistan, South Sudan)

The treaty recognizes five states as nuclear-weapon states: the United States, Russia, the United Kingdom, France, and China (also the five permanent members of the United Nations Security Council). China and France acceded to the treaty in 1992. Four other states are known or believed to possess nuclear weapons: India, Pakistan and North Korea have openly tested and declared that they possess nuclear weapons, while Israel has had a policy of opacity regarding its nuclear weapons program. India, Israel, and Pakistan have never signed the treaty, while North Korea was a party to the treaty but announced its withdrawal on 10 January 2003, which became effective ninety days later. However, there is disagreement among the parties to the treaty whether North Korea's withdrawal was in conformity with the terms of the treaty.

The NPT remains the most widely subscribed to nuclear arms control treaty in history. As of February 2015, 190 states are recognized as parties to the treaty, excluding North Korea which withdrew. The State of Palestine is the most recent state to have joined, having submitted its instrument of succession on 10 February 2015. In addition, the Republic of China (Taiwan), which is currently only recognized by 11 UN member states, ratified the treaty prior to the United Nations General Assembly's vote to transfer China's seat to the People's Republic of China (PRC) in 1971; Taiwan has accepted comprehensive International Atomic Energy Agency (IAEA) safeguards and the measures of the Additional Protocol to verify that its nuclear program is entirely peaceful. Four UN member states have never signed the treaty: India, Israel, Pakistan, and South Sudan. The Cook Islands and Niue, two associated states of New Zealand which have had their "full treaty-making capacity" recognised by United Nations Secretariat, are not parties to the treaty but consider themselves bound by its provisions by virtue of their administration by New Zealand when the latter ratified the NPT.

== Ratified or acceded states ==
189 UN member states as well as two observers, namely the Holy See and the State of Palestine, have become parties to the NPT. However, one of these states (North Korea) submitted a notice of withdrawal. See the section #Withdrawn state below for more details.

Multiple dates indicate the different days in which states submitted their signature or deposition, varied by location. This location is noted by: (L) for London, (M) for Moscow, and (W) for Washington D.C.

Bolded states with a dagger (†) are recognized as nuclear weapons states by the treaty.

| State | Signed | Deposited | Method |
|---|---|---|---|
| Afghanistan | 1 Jul 1968 (L, M, W) | 4 Feb 1970 (W); 5 Feb 1970 (M); 5 Mar 1970 (L) | Ratification |
| Albania | | 12 Sep 1990 (L); 14 Sep 1990 (M); 28 Sep 1990 (W) | Accession |
| Algeria | | 12 Jan 1995 (L, M, W) | Accession |
| Andorra | | 7 Jun 1996 (L); 25 Jun 1996 (W); 2 Jul 1996 (M) | Accession |
| Angola | | 14 Oct 1996 (W); 30 Apr 2010 (M) | Accession |
| Antigua and Barbuda | | 17 Jun 1985 (L) | Succession from United Kingdom |
| Argentina | | 10 Feb 1995 (W); 17 Feb 1995 (L) | Accession |
| Armenia | | 21 Jun 1993 (M); 15 Jul 1993 (W) | Accession |
| Australia | 27 Feb 1970 (L, M, W) | 23 Jan 1973 (L, M, W) | Ratification |
| Austria | 1 Jul 1968 (L, M, W) | 27 Jun 1969 (L, W); 28 Jun 1969 (M) | Ratification |
| Azerbaijan | | 22 Sep 1992 (M) | Accession |
| Bahamas | | 11 Aug 1976 (L); 13 Aug 1976 (W); 30 Aug 1976 (M) | Succession from United Kingdom |
| Bahrain | | 3 Nov 1988 (W) | Accession |
| Bangladesh | | 31 Aug 1979 (L, M); 27 Sep 1979 (W) | Accession |
| Barbados | 1 Jul 1968 (W) | 21 Feb 1980 (W) | Ratification |
| Belarus | | 9 Feb 1993 (M); 22 Jul 1993 (W); 23 Jul 1993 (L) | Accession |
| Belgium | 20 Aug 1968 (L, M, W) | 2 May 1975 (L, W); 4 May 1975 (M) | Ratification |
| Belize | | 9 Aug 1985 (L) | Succession from United Kingdom |
| Benin | 1 Jul 1968 (W) | 31 Oct 1972 (W) | Ratification |
| Bhutan | | 23 May 1985 (W) | Accession |
| Bolivia | 1 Jul 1968 (W) | 26 May 1970 (W) | Ratification |
| Bosnia and Herzegovina | | 15 Aug 1994 (W) | Succession from SFR Yugoslavia |
| Botswana | 1 Jul 1968 (W) | 28 Apr 1969 (L) | Ratification |
| Brazil | | 18 Sep 1998 (L, M, W) | Accession |
| Brunei | | 26 Mar 1985 (W) | Accession |
| Bulgaria | 1 Jul 1968 (L, M, W) | 5 Sep 1969 (W); 18 Sep 1969 (M); 3 Nov 1969 (L) | Ratification |
| Burkina Faso | 25 Nov 1968 (W); 11 Aug 1969 (M) | 3 Mar 1970 (W) | Ratification |
| Burundi | | 19 Mar 1971 (M) | Accession |
| Cabo Verde | | 24 Oct 1979 (M) | Accession |
| Cambodia | | 2 Jun 1972 (W); 25 Sep 1987 (M) | Accession |
| Cameroon | 17 Jul 1968 (W); 18 Jul 1968 (M) | 8 Jan 1969 (W) | Ratification |
| Canada | 23 Jul 1968 (L, W); 29 Jul 1968 (M) | 8 Jan 1969 (L, M, W) | Ratification |
| Central African Republic | | 25 Oct 1970 (W) | Accession |
| Chad | 1 Jul 1968 (M) | 10 Mar 1971 (W); 11 Mar 1971 (M); 23 Mar 1971 (L) | Ratification |
| Chile | | 25 May 1995 (W) | Accession |
| **China**† | | 9 Mar 1992 (L); 12 Mar 1992 (M); 17 Mar 1992 (W) | Accession |
| Colombia | 1 Jul 1968 (W) | 8 Apr 1986 (W); 29 Apr 1986 (M); 30 Apr 1986 (L) | Ratification |
| Comoros | | 4 Oct 1995 (W) | Accession |
| Republic of the Congo | 26 Jul 1968 (M) | 23 Oct 1978 (W) | Ratification |
| Costa Rica | 1 Jul 1968 (W) | 3 Mar 1970 (W) | Ratification |
| Côte d'Ivoire | 1 Jul 1968 (W) | 6 Mar 1973 (W) | Ratification |
| Croatia | | 29 Jun 1992 (W) | Succession from SFR Yugoslavia |
| Cuba | | 4 Nov 2002 (M) | Accession |
| Cyprus | 1 Jul 1968 (L, M, W) | 10 Feb 1970 (M); 16 Feb 1970 (W); 5 Mar 1970 (L) | Ratification |
| Czech Republic | | 1 Jan 1993 (M, W); 5 Apr 1993 (L) | Succession from Czechoslovakia; Signed 1 July 1968; Deposited 22 July 1969 |
| Democratic Republic of the Congo | 22 Jul 1968 (W); 17 Sep 1968 (L) | 4 Aug 1970 (W) | Ratification |
| Denmark | 1 Jul 1968 (L, M, W) | 3 Jan 1969 (L, M, W) | Ratification |
| Djibouti | | 16 Oct 1996 (W) | Accession |
| Dominica | | 10 Aug 1984 (L) | Succession from United Kingdom |
| Dominican Republic | 1 Jul 1968 (W) | 24 Jul 1971 (W) | Ratification |
| Ecuador | 9 Jul 1968 (W) | 7 Mar 1969 (W) | Ratification |
| Egypt | 1 Jul 1968 (L, M) | 26 Feb 1981 (L) | Ratification |
| El Salvador | 1 Jul 1968 (W) | 11 Jul 1972 (W) | Ratification |
| Equatorial Guinea | | 1 Nov 1984 (W) | Accession |
| Eritrea | | 16 Mar 1995 (W) | Accession |
| Estonia | | 7 Jan 1992 (L); 31 Jan 1992 (W) | Accession |
| Ethiopia | 5 Sep 1968 (L, M, W) | 5 Feb 1970 (M); 5 Mar 1970 (L, W) | Ratification |
| Fiji | | 21 Jul 1972 (W); 14 Aug 1972 (L); 29 Aug 1972 (M) | Succession from United Kingdom |
| Finland | 1 Jul 1968 (L, M, W) | 5 Feb 1969 (L, M, W) | Ratification |
| **France**† | | 2 Aug 1992 (M); 3 Aug 1992 (L, W) | Accession |
| Gabon | | 19 Feb 1974 (W) | Accession |
| Gambia | 4 Sep 1968 (L); 20 Sep 1968 (W); 24 Sep 1968 (M) | 12 May 1975 (W) | Ratification |
| Georgia | | 7 Mar 1994 (W) | Accession |
| Germany | 28 Nov 1969 (L, M, W) | 2 May 1975 (L, W) | Ratification as West Germany; Also East Germany; Ratified 31 October 1969 |
| Ghana | 1 Jul 1968 (M, W); 24 Jul 1968 (L) | 4 May 1970 (L); 5 May 1970 (W); 11 May 1970 (M) | Ratification |
| Greece | 1 Jul 1968 (M, W) | 11 Mar 1970 (W) | Ratification |
| Grenada | | 2 Sep 1975 (L); 3 Dec 1975 (W) | Succession from United Kingdom |
| Guatemala | 26 Jul 1968 (W) | 22 Sep 1970 (W) | Ratification |
| Guinea | | 29 Apr 1985 (M) | Accession |
| Guinea-Bissau | | 20 Aug 1976 (M) | Accession |
| Guyana | | 19 Oct 1993 (W) | Accession |
| Haiti | 1 Jul 1968 (W) | 2 Jun 1970 (W) | Ratification |
| Holy See | | 25 Feb 1971 (L, M, W) | Accession |
| Honduras | 1 Jul 1968 (W) | 16 May 1973 (W) | Ratification |
| Hungary | 1 Jul 1968 (L, M, W) | 27 May 1969 (L, M, W) | Ratification |
| Iceland | 1 Jul 1968 (L, M, W) | 18 Jul 1969 (L, M, W) | Ratification |
| Indonesia | 2 Mar 1970 (L, M, W) | 12 Jul 1979 (L, M, W) | Ratification |
| Iran | 1 Jul 1968 (L, M, W) | 2 Feb 1970 (W); 10 Feb 1970 (M); 5 Mar 1970 (L) | Ratification |
| Iraq | 1 Jul 1968 (M) | 29 Oct 1969 (M) | Ratification |
| Ireland | 1 Jul 1968 (M, W); 4 Jul 1968 (L) | 1 Jul 1968 (W); 2 Jul 1968 (M); 4 Jul 1968 (L) | Ratification |
| Italy | 28 Jan 1969 (L, M, W) | 2 May 1975 (L, W); 4 May 1975 (M) | Ratification |
| Jamaica | 14 Apr 1969 (L, M, W) | 5 Mar 1970 (L, M, W) | Ratification |
| Japan | 3 Feb 1970 (L, M, W) | 8 Jun 1976 (L, M, W) | Ratification |
| Jordan | 10 Jul 1968 (W) | 11 Feb 1970 (W) | Ratification |
| Kazakhstan | | 14 Feb 1994 (W); 21 Mar 1994 (L); 20 May 1994 (M) | Accession |
| Kenya | 1 Jul 1968 (W) | 11 Jun 1970 (M) | Ratification |
| Kiribati | | 18 Apr 1985 (L) | Succession from United Kingdom |
| Kuwait | 15 Aug 1968 (M, W); 22 Aug 1968 (L) | 17 Nov 1989 (W) | Ratification |
| Kyrgyzstan | | 5 Jul 1994 (M) | Accession |
| Laos | 1 Jul 1968 (L, M, W) | 20 Feb 1970 (M); 5 Mar 1970 (L, W) | Ratification |
| Latvia | | 31 Jan 1992 (L) | Accession |
| Lebanon | 1 Jul 1968 (L, M, W) | 15 Jul 1970 (L, M); 20 Nov 1970 (W) | Ratification |
| Lesotho | 9 Jul 1968 (W) | 20 May 1970 (W) | Ratification |
| Liberia | 1 Jul 1968 (W) | 5 Mar 1970 (W) | Ratification |
| Libya | 18 Jul 1968 (L); 19 Jul 1968 (W); 23 Jul 1968 (M) | 26 May 1975 (L, M, W) | Ratification |
| Liechtenstein | | 20 Apr 1978 (L, M, W) | Accession |
| Lithuania | | 23 Sep 1991 (L, W) | Accession |
| Luxembourg | 14 Aug 1968 (L, M, W) | 2 May 1975 (L, W); 4 May 1975 (M) | Ratification |
| North Macedonia | | 30 Mar 1995 (L); 12 Apr 1995 (W) | Succession from SFR Yugoslavia |
| Madagascar | 22 Aug 1968 (W) | 8 Oct 1970 (W) | Ratification |
| Malawi | | 18 Feb 1986 (L); 19 Feb 1986 (W); 4 Mar 1986 (M) | Accession |
| Malaysia | 1 Jul 1968 (L, M, W) | 5 Mar 1970 (L, M, W) | Ratification |
| Maldives | 11 Sep 1968 (W) | 7 Apr 1970 (W) | Ratification |
| Mali | 14 Jul 1969 (W); 15 Jul 1969 (M) | 10 Feb 1970 (M); 5 Mar 1970 (W) | Ratification |
| Malta | 17 Apr 1969 (W) | 6 Feb 1970 (W) | Ratification |
| Marshall Islands | | 30 Jan 1995 (W) | Accession |
| Mauritania | | 26 Oct 1993 (W) | Accession |
| Mauritius | 1 Jul 1968 (W) | 8 Apr 1969 (W); 14 Apr 1969 (L); 25 Apr 1969 (M) | Ratification |
| Mexico | 26 Jul 1968 (L, M, W) | 21 Jan 1969 (L, M, W) | Ratification |
| Federated States of Micronesia | | 14 Apr 1995 (W) | Accession |
| Moldova | | 11 Oct 1994 (W) | Accession |
| Monaco | | 13 Mar 1995 (W) | Accession |
| Mongolia | 1 Jul 1968 (M) | 14 May 1969 (M) | Ratification |
| Montenegro | | 3 Jun 2006 (M); 12 Dec 2006 (L) | Succession from Serbia and Montenegro |
| Morocco | 1 Jul 1968 (L, M, W) | 27 Nov 1970 (M); 30 Nov 1970 (L); 16 Dec 1970 (W) | Ratification |
| Mozambique | | 4 Sep 1990 (M); 12 Sep 1990 (W); 20 Sep 1990 (L) | Accession |
| Myanmar | | 2 Dec 1992 (W) | Accession |
| Namibia | | 2 Oct 1992 (L); 7 Oct 1992 (W); 9 Oct 1992 (M) | Accession |
| Nauru | | 7 Jun 1982 (L) | Accession |
| Nepal | 1 Jul 1968 (L, M, W) | 5 Jan 1970 (W); 9 Jan 1970 (M); 3 Feb 1970 (L) | Ratification |
| Netherlands | 20 Aug 1968 (L, M, W) | 2 May 1975 (L, M, W) | Ratification |
| New Zealand | 1 Jul 1968 (L, M, W) | 10 Sep 1969 (L, M, W) | Ratification |
| Nicaragua | 1 Jul 1968 (L, W) | 6 Mar 1973 (W) | Ratification |
| Niger | | 9 Oct 1992 (W) | Accession |
| Nigeria | 1 Jul 1968 (L, M, W) | 27 Sep 1968 (L); 7 Oct 1968 (W); 14 Oct 1968 (M) | Ratification |
| Norway | 1 Jul 1968 (L, M, W) | 5 Feb 1969 (L, M, W) | Ratification |
| Oman | | 23 Jan 1997 (W) | Accession |
| Palau | | 14 Apr 1995 (W) | Accession |
| Palestine | | 10 Feb 2015 (M); 12 Feb 2015 (L) | Accession |
| Panama | 1 Jul 1968 (W) | 13 Jan 1977 (W) | Ratification |
| Papua New Guinea | | 13 Jan 1982 (L); 25 Jan 1982 (W); 16 Feb 1982 (M) | Accession |
| Paraguay | 1 Jul 1968 (W) | 4 Feb 1970 (W); 5 Mar 1970 (L) | Ratification |
| Peru | 1 Jul 1968 (W) | 3 Mar 1970 (W) | Ratification |
| Philippines | 1 Jul 1968 (W); 18 Jul 1968 (M) | 5 Oct 1972 (W); 16 Oct 1972 (L); 20 Oct 1972 (M) | Ratification |
| Poland | 1 Jul 1968 (L, M, W) | 12 Jun 1969 (L, M, W) | Ratification |
| Portugal | | 15 Dec 1977 (L, M, W) | Accession |
| Qatar | | 3 Apr 1989 (L); 10 May 1989 (M); 13 Jun 1989 (W) | Accession |
| South Korea | 1 Jul 1968 (W) | 23 Apr 1975 (W) | Ratification |
| Romania | 1 Jul 1968 (L, M, W) | 4 Feb 1970 (L, M, W) | Ratification |
| **Russia**† | 1 Jul 1968 (L, M, W) | 5 Mar 1970 (L, M, W) | Ratification as Soviet Union |
| Rwanda | | 20 May 1975 (L, M, W) | Accession |
| Saint Kitts and Nevis | | 22 Mar 1993 (W) | Accession |
| Saint Lucia | | 28 Dec 1979 (L) | Succession from United Kingdom |
| Saint Vincent and the Grenadines | | 6 Nov 1984 (L) | Succession from United Kingdom |
| Samoa | | 17 Mar 1975 (M); 18 Mar 1975 (W); 26 Mar 1975 (L) | Accession |
| San Marino | 1 Jul 1968 (W); 29 Jul 1968 (L); 21 Nov 1968 (M) | 10 Aug 1970 (L); 20 Aug 1970 (M); 31 Aug 1970 (W) | Ratification |
| Sao Tome and Principe | | 20 Jul 1983 (M) | Accession |
| Saudi Arabia | | 3 Oct 1988 (W) | Accession |
| Senegal | 1 Jul 1968 (M, W); 26 Jul 1968 (L) | 17 Dec 1970 (M); 22 Dec 1970 (W); 15 Jan 1971 (L) | Ratification |
| Serbia | | 27 Apr 1992 (M); 5 Sep 2001 (W); 3 Jun 2006 (L) | Succession from SFR Yugoslavia; Signed 10 July 1968 (L, M, W); Deposited 4 March 1970 (W), 5 March 1970 (L, M); Succession from Serbia and Montenegro |
| Seychelles | | 12 Mar 1985 (L); 14 Mar 1985 (M); 8 Apr 1985 (W) | Accession |
| Sierra Leone | | 26 Feb 1975 (L, M, W) | Accession |
| Singapore | 5 Feb 1970 (L, M, W) | 10 Mar 1976 (L, M, W) | Ratification |
| Slovakia | | 1 Jan 1993 (M, W); 17 Apr 1993 (L) | Succession from Czechoslovakia; Signed 1 July 1968; Deposited 22 July 1969 |
| Slovenia | | 7 Apr 1992 (L); 20 Aug 1992 (W) | Succession from SFR Yugoslavia |
| Solomon Islands | | 17 Jun 1981 (L) | Succession from United Kingdom |
| Somalia | 1 Jul 1968 (L, M, W) | 5 Mar 1970 (L); 12 Nov 1970 (W) | Ratification |
| South Africa | | 10 Jul 1991 (W) | Accession |
| Spain | | 5 Nov 1987 (L, M, W) | Accession |
| Sri Lanka | 1 Jul 1968 (L, M, W) | 5 Mar 1979 (L, M, W) | Ratification |
| Sudan | 24 Dec 1968 (M) | 31 Oct 1973 (W); 22 Nov 1973 (M); 10 Dec 1973 (L) | Ratification |
| Suriname | | 30 Jun 1976 (W) | Succession from Netherlands |
| Swaziland | 24 Jun 1969 (L) | 11 Dec 1969 (L); 16 Dec 1969 (W); 12 Jan 1970 (M) | Ratification |
| Sweden | 19 Aug 1968 (L, M, W) | 9 Jan 1970 (L, M, W) | Ratification |
| Switzerland | 27 Nov 1969 (L, M, W) | 9 Mar 1977 (L, M, W) | Ratification |
| Syria | 1 Jul 1968 (M) | 24 Sep 1969 (M) | Ratification |
| Tajikistan | | 17 Jan 1995 (M) | Accession |
| Tanzania | | 31 May 1991 (L); 7 Jun 1991 (W); 18 Jun 1991 (M) | Accession |
| Thailand | | 7 Dec 1972 (L) | Accession |
| Timor-Leste | | 5 May 2003 (W) | Accession |
| Togo | 1 Jul 1968 (W) | 27 Feb 1970 (W) | Ratification |
| Tonga | | 7 Jul 1971 (L); 15 Jul 1971 (W); 24 Aug 1971 (M) | Succession from United Kingdom |
| Trinidad and Tobago | 20 Aug 1968 (W); 22 Aug 1968 (L) | 30 Oct 1986 (L, W) | Ratification |
| Tunisia | 1 Jul 1968 (L, M, W) | 26 Feb 1970 (L, M, W) | Ratification |
| Turkey | 28 Jan 1969 (L, M, W) | 17 Apr 1980 (L, M, W) | Ratification |
| Turkmenistan | | 29 Sep 1994 (W) | Accession |
| Tuvalu | | 19 Jan 1979 (L) | Succession from United Kingdom |
| Uganda | | 20 Oct 1982 (W) | Accession |
| Ukraine | | 5 Dec 1994 (L, M, W) | Accession |
| United Arab Emirates | | 26 Sep 1995 (W) | Accession |
| **United Kingdom**† | 1 Jul 1968 (L, M, W) | 27 Nov 1968 (L, W); 29 Nov 1968 (M) | Ratification |
| **United States**† | 1 Jul 1968 (L, M, W) | 5 Mar 1970 (L, M, W) | Ratification |
| Uruguay | 1 Jul 1968 (W) | 31 Aug 1970 (W) | Ratification |
| Uzbekistan | | 7 May 1992 (M) | Accession |
| Vanuatu | | 24 Aug 1995 (L) | Accession |
| Venezuela | 1 Jul 1968 (W) | 25 Sep 1975 (L); 26 Sep 1975 (W); 3 Oct 1975 (M) | Ratification |
| Vietnam | | 14 Jun 1982 (M) | Accession as the Socialist Republic of Vietnam; Signed by the Republic of Vietnam on 1 July 1968, and ratified on 10 September 1971, but following the victory by the Democratic Republic of Vietnam in the Vietnam War, the reunified Socialist Republic of Vietnam renounced all treaty actions performed by the Republic of Vietnam. |
| Yemen | 23 Sep 1968 (M) | 14 May 1986 (L); 26 Jan 1989 (M) | Ratification as North Yemen (L) and South Yemen (M) prior to Yemeni unification. |
| Zambia | | 15 May 1991 (W); 22 May 1991 (L); 5 Jul 1991 (M) | Accession |
| Zimbabwe | | 26 Sep 1991 (L, M); 4 Oct 1991 (W) | Accession |

== Partially recognized state abiding by treaty ==
The Republic of China (Taiwan), which is currently only recognized by 11 UN member states, ratified the treaty prior to the United Nations General Assembly's vote to transfer China's seat to the People's Republic of China (PRC) in 1971. When the PRC subsequently ratified the treaty, they described the Republic of China's (ROC) ratification as "illegal". The ROC has committed itself to continue to adhere to the requirements of the treaty, and the United States has declared that it still regards the authorities in Taiwan to be bound by the NPT's obligations.

| State | Signed | Deposited | Method |
|---|---|---|---|
| Taiwan | 1 Jul 1968 (W) | 27 Jan 1970 (W) | Ratification |

== Withdrawn state ==
Article X.1 allows a state to leave the treaty if "extraordinary events, related to the subject matter of this Treaty, have jeopardized the supreme interests of its country", giving three months notice. The state is required to give reasons for leaving the NPT in this notice, and to provide this notice to other NPT Parties and to the UN Security Council. This Article does not provide for other states to question a state's interpretation of "supreme interests of its country".

North Korea acceded to the NPT in 1985. On 12 March 1993, after it was found in non-compliance with its safeguards agreement, North Korea gave notice to withdraw from the NPT. However, on 11 June 1993, one day before the withdrawal was to take effect, North Korea reached agreement with the United States to freeze its nuclear program under the Agreed Framework and "suspended" its withdrawal notice. In October 2002, the United States accused North Korea of violating the Agreed Framework by pursuing a secret uranium enrichment program, and suspended shipments of heavy fuel oil under that agreement. In response, North Korea expelled IAEA inspectors, disabled IAEA equipment and, on 10 January 2003, announced that it was ending the suspension of its previous NPT withdrawal notification.

There is disagreement among the parties to the treaty whether North Korea's withdrawal was in conformity with the terms of the treaty. North Korea said that only one more day's notice was sufficient for withdrawal from the NPT, as it had given 89 days before. The IAEA Board of Governors rejected this interpretation. Most countries held that a new three-months withdrawal notice was required, and some questioned whether North Korea's notification met the "extraordinary events" and "supreme interests" requirements of the Treaty. The Joint Statement of 19 September 2005 at the end of the Fourth Round of the Six-Party Talks called for North Korea to "return" to the NPT, implicitly acknowledging that it had withdrawn. As of October, 2016, North Korea has conducted five announced nuclear tests between October 9, 2006, to September 9, 2016.

In 2020, Iran threatened to withdraw from the NPT if it is referred to the United Nations Security Council for alleged breaching the Joint Comprehensive Plan of Action. On 16 June 2025, as a result of the Twelve-Day War, Iran announced that its parliament was drafting a bill to withdraw from the NPT.

| State | Deposited | Method | Withdrew | Effective |
|---|---|---|---|---|
| North Korea | 12 Dec 1985 (M) | Accession | 12 Mar 1993 (M) | Suspended 11 June 1993 |
| North Korea | 12 Dec 1985 (M) | Accession | 10 Jan 2003 | 10 Apr 2003 |

== Other states ==
Four UN member states have never been a party to the treaty.

- India
- Israel
- Pakistan
- South Sudan

The Cook Islands and Niue, two associated states of New Zealand which have had their "full treaty-making capacity" recognised by United Nations Secretariat, are not parties to the treaty but consider themselves bound by its provisions by virtue of their administration by New Zealand when the latter ratified the NPT.

== See also ==
- List of parties to the Biological Weapons Convention
- List of parties to the Chemical Weapons Convention
- List of parties to the Convention on Certain Conventional Weapons
- List of parties to the Comprehensive Nuclear-Test-Ban Treaty
- List of parties to the Ottawa Treaty
- List of parties to the Partial Nuclear Test Ban Treaty
- List of parties to the Treaty on the Prohibition of Nuclear Weapons
- List of parties to weapons of mass destruction treaties
