= List of parties to the Chemical Weapons Convention =

Participation in the Chemical Weapons Convention Signed and ratified Acceded Signed but not ratified Non-signatory

Parties to the Chemical Weapons Convention encompasses the states that have ratified or acceded to the Chemical Weapons Convention, a multilateral treaty outlawing the production, stockpiling, and use of chemical weapons. In addition, these states are members of the Organisation for the Prohibition of Chemical Weapons (OPCW).

On January 13, 1993, the Convention was opened for signature. Fiji became the first state to ratify the Convention on January 20, 1993. Pursuant to article 21 of the Convention, it entered into force on April 29, 1997, after it had been ratified by 65 states. The Convention was closed for signature on the preceding day, and states that did not sign the Convention can now only accede to it. Pursuant to article 21 of the Convention, for states that ratify or accede to the Convention after this date, the Convention enters into force 30 days after their deposit of the instrument of ratification or accession.

A total of 197 states may become parties to the Chemical Weapons Convention, including 193 United Nations member states, the Cook Islands, Niue, Palestine, and Vatican City. As of August 2022, 193 states have ratified or acceded to the Convention (most recently Palestine on 17 May 2018) and another state (Israel) has signed but not ratified the Convention. Only Egypt, North Korea, and South Sudan have neither signed nor acceded to the Convention. All four states which are not parties are suspected of possessing chemical weapons.

Of the four non-parties, South Sudan stated in December 2017 that it "has all but concluded the process of joining the Organisation for the Prohibition of Chemical Weapons". Ahmet Üzümcü, the Director-General of the OPCW, has stated that Egypt, Israel, and North Korea had "regional reasons" for not joining. Egypt has promised to ratify the Convention if Israel, the only state in the Middle East that is believed to possess nuclear weapons, ratifies the Treaty on the Non-Proliferation of Nuclear Weapons. Israel, meanwhile, has stated that it will ratify the Convention if all other non-parties in the region (of which only Egypt remains) do so as well. In addition, Israel has been reluctant to ratify due to an unwillingness to grant OPCW inspectors access to its military bases. North Korea is thought to be unlikely to become a party for the foreseeable future.

== List of state parties ==
State party	Signed	Deposited	Entered into force
Afghanistan	14 January 1993	24 September 2003	24 October 2003
Albania	14 January 1993	11 May 1994	29 April 1997
Algeria	13 January 1993	14 August 1995	29 April 1997
Andorra	—	27 February 2003	29 March 2003
Angola	—	16 September 2015	16 October 2015
Antigua and Barbuda	—	29 August 2005	28 September 2005
Argentina	13 January 1993	2 October 1995	29 April 1997
Armenia	19 March 1993	27 January 1995	29 April 1997
Australia	13 January 1993	6 May 1994	29 April 1997
Austria	13 January 1993	17 August 1995	29 April 1997
Azerbaijan	13 January 1993	29 February 2000	30 March 2000
Bahamas, The	2 March 1994	23 April 2009	22 May 2009
Bahrain	24 February 1993	28 April 1997	29 April 1997
Bangladesh	14 January 1993	25 April 1997	29 April 1997
Barbados	—	7 March 2007	6 April 2007
Belarus	14 January 1993	11 July 1996	29 April 1997
Belgium	13 January 1993	27 January 1997	29 April 1997
Belize	—	1 December 2003	31 December 2003
Benin	14 January 1993	14 May 1998	13 June 1998
Bhutan	24 April 1997	18 August 2005	17 September 2005
Bolivia	14 January 1993	14 August 1998	13 September 1998
Bosnia and Herzegovina	16 January 1997	25 February 1997	29 April 1997
Botswana	—	31 August 1998	30 September 1998
Brazil	13 January 1993	13 March 1996	29 April 1997
Brunei	13 January 1993	28 July 1997	27 August 1997
Bulgaria	13 January 1993	10 August 1994	29 April 1997
Burkina Faso	14 January 1993	8 July 1997	7 August 1997
Burundi	15 January 1993	4 September 1998	4 October 1998
Cape Verde	15 January 1993	10 October 2003	9 November 2003
Cambodia	15 January 1993	19 July 2005	18 August 2005
Cameroon	14 January 1993	16 September 1996	29 April 1997
Canada	13 January 1993	26 September 1995	29 April 1997
Central African Republic	14 January 1993	20 September 2006	20 October 2006
Chad	11 October 1994	13 February 2004	14 March 2004
Chile	14 January 1993	12 July 1996	29 April 1997
China	13 January 1993	25 April 1997	29 April 1997
Colombia	13 January 1993	5 April 2000	5 May 2000
Comoros	13 January 1993	18 August 2006	17 September 2006
Congo, Democratic Republic of the	14 January 1993	12 October 2005	11 November 2005
Congo, Republic of the	15 January 1993	4 December 2007	3 January 2008
Cook Islands	14 January 1993	15 July 1994	29 April 1997
Costa Rica	14 January 1993	31 May 1996	29 April 1997
Côte d'Ivoire	13 January 1993	18 December 1995	29 April 1997
Croatia	13 January 1993	23 May 1995	29 April 1997
Cuba	13 January 1993	29 April 1997	29 May 1997
Cyprus	13 January 1993	28 August 1998	27 September 1998
Czech Republic	14 January 1993	6 March 1996	29 April 1997
Denmark	14 January 1993	13 July 1995	29 April 1997
Djibouti	28 September 1993	25 January 2006	24 February 2006
Dominica	2 August 1993	12 February 2001	14 March 2001
Dominican Republic	13 January 1993	27 March 2009	26 April 2009
East Timor	—	7 May 2003	6 June 2003
Ecuador	14 January 1993	6 September 1995	29 April 1997
El Salvador	14 January 1993	30 October 1995	29 April 1997
Equatorial Guinea	14 January 1993	25 April 1997	29 April 1997
Eritrea	—	14 February 2000	15 March 2000
Estonia	14 January 1993	26 May 1999	25 June 1999
Eswatini	23 September 1993	20 November 1996	29 April 1997
Ethiopia	14 January 1993	13 May 1996	29 April 1997
Fiji	14 January 1993	20 January 1993	29 April 1997
Finland	14 January 1993	7 February 1995	29 April 1997
France	13 January 1993	2 March 1995	29 April 1997
Gabon	13 January 1993	8 September 2000	8 October 2000
Gambia, The	13 January 1993	19 May 1998	18 June 1998
Georgia	14 January 1993	27 November 1995	29 April 1997
Germany	13 January 1993	12 August 1994	29 April 1997
Ghana	14 January 1993	9 July 1997	8 August 1997
Greece	13 January 1993	22 December 1994	29 April 1997
Grenada	9 April 1997	3 June 2005	3 July 2005
Guatemala	14 January 1993	12 February 2003	14 March 2003
Guinea	14 January 1993	9 June 1997	9 July 1997
Guinea-Bissau	14 January 1993	20 May 2008	19 June 2008
Guyana	6 October 1993	12 September 1997	12 October 1997
Haiti	14 January 1993	22 February 2006	24 March 2006
Honduras	13 January 1993	29 August 2005	28 September 2005
Hungary	13 January 1993	31 October 1996	29 April 1997
Iceland	13 January 1993	28 April 1997	29 April 1997
India	14 January 1993	3 September 1996	29 April 1997
Indonesia	13 January 1993	12 November 1998	12 December 1998
Iran	13 January 1993	3 November 1997	3 December 1997
Iraq	—	13 January 2009	12 February 2009
Ireland	14 January 1993	24 June 1996	29 April 1997
Italy	13 January 1993	8 December 1995	29 April 1997
Jamaica	18 April 1997	8 September 2000	8 October 2000
Japan	13 January 1993	15 September 1995	29 April 1997
Jordan	—	29 October 1997	28 November 1997
Kazakhstan	14 January 1993	23 March 2000	22 April 2000
Kenya	15 January 1993	25 April 1997	29 April 1997
Kiribati	—	7 September 2000	7 October 2000
Korea, South	14 January 1993	28 April 1997	29 April 1997
Kuwait	27 January 1993	29 May 1997	28 June 1997
Kyrgyzstan	22 February 1993	29 September 2003	29 October 2003
Laos	13 May 1993	25 February 1997	29 April 1997
Latvia	6 May 1993	23 July 1996	29 April 1997
Lebanon	—	20 November 2008	20 December 2008
Lesotho	7 December 1994	7 December 1994	29 April 1997
Liberia	15 January 1993	23 February 2006	25 March 2006
Libya	—	6 January 2004	5 February 2004
Liechtenstein	21 July 1993	24 November 1999	24 December 1999
Lithuania	13 January 1993	15 April 1998	15 May 1998
Luxembourg	13 January 1993	15 April 1997	29 April 1997
Madagascar	15 January 1993	20 October 2004	19 November 2004
Malawi	14 January 1993	11 June 1998	11 July 1998
Malaysia	13 January 1993	20 April 2000	20 May 2000
Maldives	1 October 1993	31 May 1994	29 April 1997
Mali	13 January 1993	28 April 1997	29 April 1997
Malta	13 January 1993	28 April 1997	29 April 1997
Marshall Islands	13 January 1993	19 May 2004	18 June 2004
Mauritania	13 January 1993	9 February 1998	11 March 1998
Mauritius	14 January 1993	9 February 1993	29 April 1997
Micronesia	13 January 1993	21 June 1999	21 July 1999
Mexico	13 January 1993	29 August 1994	29 April 1997
Moldova	13 January 1993	8 July 1996	29 April 1997
Monaco	13 January 1993	1 June 1995	29 April 1997
Mongolia	14 January 1993	17 January 1995	29 April 1997
Montenegro (Note: Montenegro succeeded to the Chemical Weapons Convention on 3 June 2006, the date of its independence from Serbia and Montenegro, per a declaration it sent to the Secretary-General of the United Nations, which was received on 23 October 2006.)	—	23 October 2006	3 June 2006
Morocco	13 January 1993	28 December 1995	29 April 1997
Mozambique	—	15 August 2000	14 September 2000
Myanmar	14 January 1993	8 July 2015	7 August 2015
Namibia	13 January 1993	27 November 1995	29 April 1997
Nauru	13 January 1993	12 November 2001	12 December 2001
Nepal	19 January 1993	18 November 1997	18 December 1997
Netherlands (Note: The Convention was extended to the Netherlands Antilles (now the Caribbean Netherlands, Curaçao, and Sint Maarten) and Aruba on 28 April 1997.)	14 January 1993	30 June 1995	29 April 1997
New Zealand	14 January 1993	15 July 1996	29 April 1997
Nicaragua	9 March 1993	5 November 1999	5 December 1999
Niger	14 January 1993	9 April 1997	29 April 1997
Nigeria	13 January 1993	20 May 1999	19 June 1999
Niue	—	21 April 2005	21 May 2005
North Macedonia	—	20 June 1997	20 July 1997
Norway	13 January 1993	7 April 1994	29 April 1997
Oman	2 February 1993	8 February 1995	29 April 1997
Pakistan	13 January 1993	28 October 1997	27 November 1997
Palau	—	3 February 2003	5 March 2003
Panama	16 June 1993	7 October 1998	6 November 1998
Palestine (Note: Palestine originally submitted an instrument of accession to the Secretary-General of the United Nations depositary on 29 December 2017, but subsequently notified the depositary of its withdrawal of this instrument on 8 January 2018. Palestine resubmitted an instrument of accession on 17 May 2018.)	—	17 May 2018	16 June 2018
Papua New Guinea	14 January 1993	17 April 1996	29 April 1997
Paraguay	14 January 1993	1 December 1994	29 April 1997
Peru	14 January 1993	20 July 1995	29 April 1997
Philippines	13 January 1993	11 December 1996	29 April 1997
Poland	13 January 1993	23 August 1995	29 April 1997
Portugal	13 January 1993	10 September 1996	29 April 1997
Qatar	1 February 1993	3 September 1997	3 October 1997
Romania	13 January 1993	15 February 1995	29 April 1997
Russia	13 January 1993	5 November 1997	5 December 1997
Rwanda	17 May 1993	31 March 2004	30 April 2004
Saint Kitts and Nevis	16 March 1994	21 May 2004	20 June 2004
Saint Lucia	29 March 1993	9 April 1997	29 April 1997
Saint Vincent and the Grenadines	20 September 1993	18 September 2002	18 October 2002
Samoa	14 January 1993	27 September 2002	27 October 2002
San Marino	13 January 1993	10 December 1999	9 January 2000
São Tomé and Príncipe	—	9 September 2003	9 October 2003
Saudi Arabia	20 January 1993	9 August 1996	29 April 1997
Senegal	13 January 1993	20 July 1998	19 August 1998
Serbia	—	20 April 2000	20 May 2000
Seychelles	15 January 1993	7 April 1993	29 April 1997
Sierra Leone	15 January 1993	30 September 2004	30 October 2004
Singapore	14 January 1993	21 May 1997	20 June 1997
Slovakia	14 January 1993	27 October 1995	29 April 1997
Slovenia	14 January 1993	11 June 1997	11 July 1997
Solomon Islands	—	23 September 2004	23 October 2004
Somalia	—	29 May 2013	28 June 2013
South Africa	14 January 1993	13 September 1995	29 April 1997
Spain	13 January 1993	3 August 1994	29 April 1997
Sri Lanka	14 January 1993	19 August 1994	29 April 1997
Sudan	—	24 May 1999	23 June 1999
Suriname	28 April 1997	28 April 1997	29 April 1997
Sweden	13 January 1993	17 June 1993	29 April 1997
Switzerland	14 January 1993	10 March 1995	29 April 1997
Syria	—	14 September 2013	14 October 2013
Tajikistan	14 January 1993	11 January 1995	29 April 1997
Tanzania	25 February 1994	25 June 1998	25 July 1998
Thailand	14 January 1993	10 December 2002	9 January 2003
Togo	13 January 1993	23 April 1997	29 April 1997
Tonga	—	29 May 2003	28 June 2003
Trinidad and Tobago	—	24 June 1997	24 July 1997
Tunisia	13 January 1993	15 April 1997	29 April 1997
Turkey	14 January 1993	12 May 1997	11 June 1997
Turkmenistan	12 October 1993	29 September 1994	29 April 1997
Tuvalu	—	19 January 2004	18 February 2004
Uganda	14 January 1993	30 November 2001	30 December 2001
Ukraine	13 January 1993	16 October 1998	15 November 1998
United Arab Emirates	2 February 1993	28 November 2000	28 December 2000
United Kingdom (Note: The Convention was extended to Akrotiri and Dhekelia; Anguilla; Bermuda; the British Antarctic Territory; the British Indian Ocean Territory; the British Virgin Islands; the Cayman Islands; the Falkland Islands; Gibraltar; Guernsey; the Isle of Man; Jersey; Montserrat; the Pitcairn Islands; Saint Helena, Ascension and Tristan da Cunha; South Georgia and the South Sandwich Islands; and the Turks and Caicos Islands on 26 October 2005.)	13 January 1993	13 May 1996	29 April 1997
United States	13 January 1993	25 April 1997	29 April 1997
Uruguay	15 January 1993	6 October 1994	29 April 1997
Uzbekistan	24 November 1995	23 July 1996	29 April 1997
Vanuatu	—	16 September 2005	16 October 2005
Vatican City	14 January 1993	12 May 1999	11 June 1999
Venezuela	14 January 1993	3 December 1997	2 January 1998
Vietnam	13 January 1993	30 September 1998	30 October 1998
Yemen	8 February 1993	2 October 2000	1 November 2000
Zambia	13 January 1993	9 February 2001	11 March 2001
Zimbabwe	13 January 1993	25 April 1997	29 April 1997

== States that have signed but not ratified ==
- Israel – 13 January 1993

== Non-signatory states ==
The following states are eligible to become parties to the Convention, but have not acceded to it.

- Egypt
- North Korea
- South Sudan

== States with limited recognition ==
- Taiwan – though not eligible to become a party to the Convention due to its limited recognition, it stated on 27 August 2002 that it had fully complied with the Convention.

== See also ==
- Australia Group
- List of parties to the Biological Weapons Convention
- List of parties to the Convention on Certain Conventional Weapons
- List of parties to the Comprehensive Nuclear-Test-Ban Treaty
- List of parties to the Treaty on the Non-Proliferation of Nuclear Weapons
- List of parties to the Treaty on the Prohibition of Nuclear Weapons
- List of parties to the Ottawa Treaty
- List of parties to the Partial Nuclear Test Ban Treaty
- List of parties to weapons of mass destruction treaties
