= List of parties to the Comprehensive Nuclear-Test-Ban Treaty =

Participation in the Comprehensive Nuclear-Test-Ban Treaty: Annex 2, signed and ratified Annex 2, only signed Annex 2, non-signatory / Not Annex 2, signed and ratified Not Annex 2, only signed Not Annex 2, non-signatory

The contracting states to the Comprehensive Nuclear-Test-Ban Treaty (CTBT) are the states that have signed and ratified the international agreement banning all nuclear explosions in all environments. Technically they will not be "parties" until the treaty enters into force, at which point these states will also be Member States of the Comprehensive Nuclear-Test-Ban Treaty Organization (CTBTO), which comes into existence upon entry into force of the treaty. Non-contracting states are also listed, including those that are signatories and those are not. States Signatories are Members of the CTBTO Preparatory Commission.

On September 24, 1996, the Comprehensive Nuclear-Test-Ban Treaty (CTBT) was opened for signature. All five nuclear weapons states recognized under the Nuclear Non-Proliferation Treaty (China, France, Russia, the United Kingdom, and the United States) signed the treaty, with 66 other states following that day. Fiji became the first state to ratify the treaty on October 10, 1996. As of July 2026, 188 states have signed and 179 states have ratified the treaty. Most recently, Tonga ratified the treaty in July 2026.

Signatures are received at the United Nations Headquarters in New York City by authorized representatives of the state. Ratification is achieved with the approval of either or both chamber of the legislature and executive of the state. The instrument of ratification serves as the document binding the state to the international treaty and can be accepted only with the validating signature of the head of state or other official with full powers to sign it. The instrument is deposited with the Secretary-General of the United Nations.

Under the CTBT, there are 195 Annex 1 states which include a subset of 44 Annex 2 states.

- Annex 1 states are agreed upon by conference and currently comprise all 193 United Nations member states, the Cook Islands, Holy See and Niue. All Annex 1 states may become members of the Executive Council, the principal decision-making body of the organization responsible for supervising its activities. These states are formally bound to the conditions of the treaty; however, their ratification is not necessary for the treaty to come into effect (unless they are also an Annex 2 state).
- Annex 2 states are those that formally participated in the 1996 Conference on Disarmament and possessed nuclear power or research reactors at the time. Annex 2 lists the following 44 States: Algeria, Argentina, Australia, Austria, Bangladesh, Belgium, Brazil, Bulgaria, Canada, Chile, China, Colombia, Democratic People's Republic of Korea, Democratic Republic of the Congo, Egypt, Finland, France, Germany, Hungary, India, Indonesia, Islamic Republic of Iran, Israel, Italy, Japan, Mexico, Netherlands, Norway, Pakistan, Peru, Poland, Republic of Korea, Romania, Russian Federation, Slovakia, South Africa, Spain, Sweden, Switzerland, Turkey, Ukraine, United Kingdom, United States of America, and Vietnam.

Nine Annex 2 states have not ratified the treaty: China, Egypt, Iran, Israel, Russia and the United States have already signed the Treaty, whereas India, North Korea and Pakistan have not signed it. The treaty will come into force only with the signature and ratification of the above Annex 2 states of the treaty, 180 days after they have all deposited their instruments of ratification.

== Summary ==
Status	Annex 2 states	Not Annex 2 states	Total	Membership
Signed and ratified	35	144	179	Parties to the CTBT; Member States of the CTBT Preparatory Commission; Member States of the CTBTO (after entry into force)
Only signed	6	3	9	Member States of the CTBT Preparatory Commission
Non-signatory	3	5	8	
Total	44	152	196	

== Ratifying states ==
State	Annex	Signed	Ratified
Afghanistan	1	Sep 24, 2003	Sep 24, 2003
Albania	1	Sep 27, 1996	Apr 23, 2003
Algeria	1, 2	Oct 15, 1996	Jul 11, 2003
Andorra	1	Sep 24, 1996	Jul 12, 2006
Angola	1	Sep 27, 1996	Mar 20, 2015
Antigua and Barbuda	1	Apr 16, 1997	Jan 11, 2006
Argentina	1, 2	Sep 24, 1996	Dec 4, 1998
Armenia	1	Oct 1, 1996	Jul 12, 2006
Australia	1, 2	Sep 24, 1996	Jul 9, 1998
Austria	1, 2	Sep 24, 1996	Mar 13, 1998
Azerbaijan	1	Jul 28, 1997	Feb 2, 1999
Bahamas	1	Feb 4, 2005	Nov 30, 2007
Bahrain	1	Sep 24, 1996	Apr 12, 2004
Bangladesh	1, 2	Oct 24, 1996	Mar 8, 2000
Barbados	1	Jan 14, 2008	Jan 14, 2008
Belarus	1	Sep 24, 1996	Sep 13, 2000
Belgium	1, 2	Sep 24, 1996	Jun 29, 1999
Belize	1	Nov 14, 2001	Mar 26, 2004
Benin	1	Sep 27, 1996	Mar 6, 2001
Bolivia	1	Sep 24, 1996	Oct 4, 1999
Bosnia and Herzegovina	1	Sep 24, 1996	Oct 26, 2006
Botswana	1	Sep 16, 2002	Oct 28, 2002
Brazil	1, 2	Sep 24, 1996	Jul 24, 1998
Brunei	1	Jan 22, 1997	Jan 10, 2013
Bulgaria	1, 2	Sep 24, 1996	Sep 29, 1999
Burkina Faso	1	Sep 27, 1996	Apr 17, 2002
Burundi	1	Sep 24, 1996	Sep 24, 2008
Cabo Verde	1	Oct 1, 1996	Mar 1, 2006
Cambodia	1	Sep 26, 1996	Nov 10, 2000
Cameroon	1	Nov 16, 2001	Feb 6, 2006
Canada	1, 2	Sep 24, 1996	Dec 18, 1998
Central African Republic	1	Dec 19, 2001	May 26, 2010
Chad	1	Oct 18, 1996	Feb 8, 2013
Chile	1, 2	Sep 24, 1996	Jul 12, 2000
Colombia	1, 2	Sep 24, 1996	Jan 29, 2008
Comoros	1	Dec 12, 1996	Feb 19, 2021
Democratic Republic of the Congo	1, 2	Oct 4, 1996	Sep 28, 2004
Republic of the Congo	1	Feb 11, 1997	Sep 2, 2014
Cook Islands	1	Dec 5, 1997	Sep 6, 2005
Costa Rica	1	Sep 24, 1996	Sep 25, 2001
Côte d'Ivoire	1	Sep 25, 1996	Mar 11, 2003
Croatia	1	Sep 24, 1996	Mar 2, 2001
Cuba	1	Feb 4, 2021	Feb 4, 2021
Cyprus	1	Sep 24, 1996	Jul 18, 2003
Czech Republic	1	Nov 12, 1996	Sep 11, 1997
Denmark	1	Sep 24, 1996	Dec 21, 1998
Djibouti	1	Oct 21, 1996	Jul 15, 2005
Dominica	1	May 25, 2022	Jun 30, 2022
Dominican Republic	1	Oct 3, 1996	Sep 4, 2007
Ecuador	1	Sep 24, 1996	Nov 12, 2001
El Salvador	1	Sep 24, 1996	Sep 11, 1998
Equatorial Guinea	1	Oct 9, 1996	Sep 21, 2022
Eritrea	1	Nov 11, 2003	Nov 11, 2003
Estonia	1	Nov 20, 1996	Aug 13, 1999
Eswatini	1	Sep 24, 1996	Sep 21, 2016
Ethiopia	1	Sep 25, 1996	Aug 8, 2006
Federated States of Micronesia	1	Sep 24, 1996	Jul 25, 1997
Fiji	1	Sep 24, 1996	Oct 10, 1996
Finland	1, 2	Sep 24, 1996	Jan 15, 1999
France	1, 2	Sep 24, 1996	Apr 6, 1998
Gabon	1	Oct 7, 1996	Sep 20, 2000
Gambia	1	Apr 9, 2003	Mar 24, 2022
Georgia	1	Sep 24, 1996	Sep 27, 2002
Germany	1, 2	Sep 24, 1996	Aug 20, 1998
Ghana	1	Oct 3, 1996	Jun 14, 2011
Greece	1	Sep 24, 1996	Apr 21, 1999
Grenada	1	Oct 10, 1996	Aug 19, 1998
Guatemala	1	Sep 20, 1999	Jan 12, 2012
Guinea	1	Oct 3, 1996	Sep 20, 2011
Guinea-Bissau	1	Apr 11, 1997	Sep 24, 2013
Guyana	1	Sep 7, 2000	Mar 7, 2001
Haiti	1	Sep 24, 1996	Dec 1, 2005
Holy See	1	Sep 24, 1996	Jul 18, 2001
Honduras	1	Sep 25, 1996	Oct 30, 2003
Hungary	1, 2	Sep 25, 1996	Jul 13, 1999
Iceland	1	Sep 24, 1996	Jun 26, 2000
Indonesia	1, 2	Sep 24, 1996	Feb 6, 2012
Iraq	1	Aug 19, 2008	Sep 26, 2013
Ireland	1	Sep 24, 1996	Jul 15, 1999
Italy	1, 2	Sep 24, 1996	Feb 1, 1999
Jamaica	1	Nov 11, 1996	Nov 13, 2001
Japan	1, 2	Sep 24, 1996	Jul 8, 1997
Jordan	1	Sep 26, 1996	Aug 25, 1998
Kazakhstan	1	Sep 30, 1996	May 14, 2002
Kenya	1	Nov 14, 1996	Nov 30, 2000
Kiribati	1	Sep 7, 2000	Sep 7, 2000
Kuwait	1	Sep 24, 1996	May 6, 2003
Kyrgyzstan	1	Oct 8, 1996	Oct 2, 2003
Laos	1	Jul 30, 1997	Oct 5, 2000
Latvia	1	Sep 24, 1996	Nov 20, 2001
Lebanon	1	Sep 16, 2005	Nov 11, 2008
Lesotho	1	Sep 30, 1996	Sep 14, 1999
Liberia	1	Oct 1, 1996	Aug 17, 2009
Libya	1	Nov 13, 2001	Jan 6, 2004
Liechtenstein	1	Sep 27, 1996	Sep 21, 2004
Lithuania	1	Oct 7, 1996	Feb 7, 2000
Luxembourg	1	Sep 24, 1996	May 26, 1999
Madagascar	1	Oct 9, 1996	Sep 15, 2005
Malawi	1	Oct 9, 1996	Nov 11, 2008
Malaysia	1	Jul 23, 1998	Jan 17, 2008
Maldives	1	Oct 1, 1997	Sep 7, 2000
Mali	1	Feb 18, 1997	Aug 4, 1999
Malta	1	Sep 24, 1996	Jul 23, 2001
Marshall Islands	1	Sep 24, 1996	Oct 28, 2009
Mauritania	1	Sep 24, 1996	Apr 30, 2003
Mexico	1, 2	Sep 24, 1996	Oct 5, 1999
Moldova	1	Sep 24, 1997	Jan 16, 2007
Monaco	1	Oct 1, 1996	Dec 18, 1998
Mongolia	1	Oct 1, 1996	Aug 8, 1997
Montenegro (succession from Serbia and Montenegro)	1	Oct 23, 2006	Oct 23, 2006
Morocco	1	Sep 24, 1996	Apr 17, 2000
Mozambique	1	Sep 26, 1996	Nov 4, 2008
Myanmar	1	Nov 25, 1996	Sep 21, 2016
Namibia	1	Sep 24, 1996	Jun 29, 2001
Nauru	1	Sep 8, 2000	Nov 12, 2001
(Kingdom of the Netherlands) Netherlands	1, 2	Sep 24, 1996	Mar 23, 1999
New Zealand	1	Sep 27, 1996	Mar 19, 1999
Nicaragua	1	Sep 24, 1996	Dec 5, 2000
Niger	1	Oct 3, 1996	Sep 9, 2002
Nigeria	1	Sep 8, 2000	Sep 27, 2001
Niue	1	Apr 9, 2012	Mar 4, 2014
North Macedonia	1	Oct 29, 1998	Mar 14, 2000
Norway	1, 2	Sep 24, 1996	Jul 15, 1999
Oman	1	Sep 23, 1999	Jun 13, 2003
Palau	1	Aug 12, 2003	Aug 1, 2007
Panama	1	Sep 24, 1996	Mar 23, 1999
Papua New Guinea	1	Sep 25, 1996	Mar 13, 2024
Paraguay	1	Sep 25, 1996	Oct 4, 2001
Peru	1, 2	Sep 25, 1996	Nov 12, 1997
Philippines	1	Sep 24, 1996	Feb 23, 2001
Poland	1, 2	Sep 24, 1996	May 25, 1999
Portugal	1	Sep 24, 1996	Jun 26, 2000
Qatar	1	Sep 24, 1996	Mar 3, 1997
Romania	1, 2	Sep 24, 1996	Oct 5, 1999
Rwanda	1	Nov 30, 2004	Nov 30, 2004
Saint Kitts and Nevis	1	Mar 23, 2004	Apr 27, 2005
Saint Lucia	1	Oct 4, 1996	Apr 5, 2001
Saint Vincent and the Grenadines	1	Jul 2, 2009	Sep 23, 2009
Samoa	1	Oct 9, 1996	Sep 27, 2002
San Marino	1	Oct 7, 1996	Mar 12, 2002
São Tomé and Príncipe	1	Sep 26, 1996	Sep 22, 2022
Senegal	1	Sep 26, 1996	Jun 9, 1999
Serbia (continuing the membership of Serbia and Montenegro)	1	Jun 8, 2001	May 19, 2004
Seychelles	1	Sep 24, 1996	Apr 13, 2004
Sierra Leone	1	Sep 8, 2000	Sep 17, 2001
Singapore	1	Jan 14, 1999	Nov 10, 2001
Slovakia	1, 2	Sep 30, 1996	Mar 3, 1998
Slovenia	1	Sep 24, 1996	Aug 31, 1999
Solomon Islands	1	Oct 3, 1996	Jan 20, 2023
South Africa	1, 2	Sep 24, 1996	Mar 30, 1999
South Korea	1, 2	Sep 24, 1996	Sep 24, 1999
Spain	1, 2	Sep 24, 1996	Jul 31, 1998
Sri Lanka	1	Oct 24, 1996	Jul 25, 2023
Sudan	1	Jun 10, 2004	Jun 10, 2004
Suriname	1	Jan 14, 1997	Feb 7, 2006
Sweden	1, 2	Sep 24, 1996	Dec 2, 1998
Switzerland	1, 2	Sep 24, 1996	Oct 1, 1999
Tajikistan	1	Oct 7, 1996	Jun 10, 1998
Tanzania	1	Sep 30, 2004	Sep 30, 2004
Thailand	1	Nov 12, 1996	Sep 25, 2018
Timor-Leste	1	Sep 26, 2008	Aug 1, 2022
Tonga	1	Jul 7, 2026	Jul 7, 2026
Togo	1	Oct 2, 1996	Jul 2, 2004
Trinidad and Tobago	1	Oct 8, 2009	May 26, 2010
Tunisia	1	Oct 16, 1996	Sep 23, 2004
Turkey	1, 2	Sep 24, 1996	Feb 16, 2000
Turkmenistan	1	Sep 24, 1996	Feb 20, 1998
Tuvalu	1	Sep 25, 2018	Mar 31, 2022
Uganda	1	Nov 7, 1996	Mar 14, 2001
Ukraine	1, 2	Sep 27, 1996	Feb 23, 2001
United Arab Emirates	1	Sep 25, 1996	Sep 18, 2000
United Kingdom	1, 2	Sep 24, 1996	Apr 6, 1998
Uruguay	1	Sep 24, 1996	Sep 21, 2001
Uzbekistan	1	Oct 3, 1996	May 29, 1997
Vanuatu	1	Sep 24, 1996	Sep 16, 2005
Venezuela	1	Oct 3, 1996	May 13, 2002
Vietnam	1, 2	Sep 24, 1996	Mar 10, 2006
Zambia	1	Dec 3, 1996	Feb 23, 2006
Zimbabwe	1	Oct 13, 1999	Feb 13, 2019

== Signatory states ==
The following 9 states have signed but not ratified the treaty.

State	Annex	Signed
China	1, 2	Sep 24, 1996
Egypt	1, 2	Oct 14, 1996
Iran	1, 2	Sep 24, 1996
Israel	1, 2	Sep 25, 1996
Nepal	1	Oct 8, 1996
Russia (Note: Ratified the treaty on 30 June 2000, but subsequently withdrew its ratification, while remaining a signatory, on 3 November 2023.)	1, 2	Sep 24, 1996
Somalia	1	Sep 8, 2023
United States	1, 2	Sep 24, 1996
Yemen	1	Sep 30, 1996

== Non-signatory states ==
The following 8 UN member states, in addition to the UN observer State of Palestine, have neither signed nor acceded to the treaty.

State	Annex
Bhutan	1
India	1, 2
Mauritius	1
North Korea	1, 2
Pakistan	1, 2
Saudi Arabia	1
South Sudan	1
Syria	1

== Ratification progress ==
India

In 1998, India said it would only sign the treaty if the United States presented a schedule for eliminating its nuclear stockpile, a condition the United States rejected.

Israel

In 2016, Israeli Prime Minister Benjamin Netanyahu said that its ratification was dependent upon "the regional context and the appropriate timing".

United States

The United States has signed the CTBT, but not ratified it; there is ongoing debate whether to ratify the CTBT.

The United States has stated that its ratification of the CTBT is conditional upon:

A: The conduct of a Science Based Stockpile Stewardship Program to ensure a high level of confidence in the safety and reliability of nuclear weapons in the active stockpile, including the conduct of a broad range of effective and continuing experimental programs.

B: The maintenance of modern nuclear laboratory facilities and programs in theoretical and exploratory nuclear technology which will attract, retain, and ensure the continued application of our human scientific resources to those programs on which continued progress in nuclear technology depends.

C: The maintenance of the basic capability to resume nuclear test activities prohibited by the CTBT should the United States cease to be bound to adhere to this treaty.

D: Continuation of a comprehensive research and development program to improve our treaty monitoring capabilities and operations.

E: The continuing development of a broad range of intelligence gathering and analytical capabilities and operations to ensure accurate and comprehensive information on worldwide nuclear arsenals, nuclear weapons development programs, and related nuclear programs.

F: The understanding that if the President of the United States is informed by the Secretary of Defense and the Secretary of Energy (DOE) – advised by the Nuclear Weapons Council, the Directors of DOE's nuclear weapons laboratories and the Commander of the U.S. Strategic Command – that a high level of confidence in the safety or reliability of a nuclear weapon type which the two Secretaries consider to be critical to the U.S. nuclear deterrent could no longer be certified, the President, in consultation with Congress, would be prepared to withdraw from the CTBT under the standard "supreme national interests" clause in order to conduct whatever testing might be required.

Proponents of ratification claim that it would:

1. Establish an international norm that would push other nuclear-capable countries like North Korea, Pakistan, and India to sign.
2. Constrain worldwide nuclear proliferation by vastly limiting a country's ability to make nuclear advancements that only testing can ensure.
3. Not compromise US national security because the Science Based Stockpile Stewardship Program serves as a means for maintaining current US nuclear capabilities without physical detonation.

Opponents of ratification claim that:

1. The treaty is unverifiable and that other nations could easily cheat.
2. The ability to enforce the treaty was dubious.
3. The U.S. nuclear stockpile would not be as safe or reliable in the absence of testing.
4. The benefit to nuclear nonproliferation was minimal.

On October 13, 1999, the United States Senate rejected ratification of the CTBT. During his 2008 presidential election campaign Barack Obama said that "As president, I will reach out to the Senate to secure the ratification of the CTBT at the earliest practical date." In his speech in Prague on April 5, 2009, he announced that "[To] achieve a global ban on nuclear testing, my administration will immediately and aggressively pursue U.S. ratification of the Comprehensive Test Ban Treaty. After more than five decades of talks, it is time for the testing of nuclear weapons to finally be banned."

An article in Bulletin of the Atomic Scientists describes how a North Korean underground nuclear test on May 25, 2009, was detected and the source located by GPS satellites. The authors suggest that the effectiveness of GPS satellites for detecting nuclear explosions enhances the ability to verify compliance with the Comprehensive Nuclear Test Ban Treaty, giving the United States more reason to ratify it.

== See also ==
- List of parties to the Biological Weapons Convention
- List of parties to the Chemical Weapons Convention
- List of parties to the Convention on Certain Conventional Weapons
- List of parties to the Ottawa Treaty
- List of parties to the Partial Nuclear Test Ban Treaty
- List of parties to the Treaty on the Non-Proliferation of Nuclear Weapons
- List of parties to the Treaty on the Prohibition of Nuclear Weapons
- List of parties to weapons of mass destruction treaties
