= List of parties to the Treaty on the Prohibition of Nuclear Weapons =

Participation in the Treaty on the Prohibition of Nuclear Weapons Parties Signatories

The list of parties to the Treaty on the Prohibition of Nuclear Weapons encompasses the states which have signed and ratified or acceded to the Treaty on the Prohibition of Nuclear Weapons, a multilateral treaty outlawing nuclear weapons.

On 20 September 2017, the treaty was opened for signature. Following Article 15 of the treaty, it entered into force on 22 January 2021 after it had been ratified by 50 states. States have the option of acceding to the treaty without signing.

A total of 197 states may become parties to the Treaty on the Prohibition of Nuclear Weapons, including all 193 member states of the United Nations, the Holy See, the State of Palestine, the Cook Islands, and Niue. As of September 2026, 75 states have ratified or acceded to the treaty, most recently Tonga, and a further 26 states have signed but not ratified the treaty.

== States Parties ==
According to the treaties database maintained by the United Nations Office for Disarmament Affairs, as of July 2026, the TPNW has 75 parties: 70 states have ratified it, and another 5 have acceded to it.

State	Signed	Deposited	Method
Antigua and Barbuda	26 September 2018	25 November 2019	Ratification
Austria	20 September 2017	8 May 2018	Ratification
Bangladesh	20 September 2017	26 September 2019	Ratification
Belize	6 February 2020	19 May 2020	Ratification
Benin	26 September 2018	11 December 2020	Ratification
Bolivia	16 April 2018	6 August 2019	Ratification
Botswana	26 September 2019	15 July 2020	Ratification
Cabo Verde	20 September 2017	20 June 2022	Ratification
Cambodia	9 January 2019	22 January 2021	Ratification
Chile	20 September 2017	23 September 2021	Ratification
Comoros	20 September 2017	19 February 2021	Ratification
Congo, Democratic Republic of the	20 September 2017	22 September 2022	Ratification
Congo, Republic of the	20 September 2017	17 May 2022	Ratification
Cook Islands		4 September 2018	Accession
Costa Rica	20 September 2017	5 July 2018	Ratification
Côte d'Ivoire	20 September 2017	23 March 2022	Ratification
Cuba	20 September 2017	30 January 2018	Ratification
Dominica	26 September 2019	18 October 2019	Ratification
Dominican Republic	7 June 2018	22 September 2022	Ratification
Ecuador	20 September 2017	25 September 2019	Ratification
El Salvador	20 September 2017	30 January 2019	Ratification
Fiji	20 September 2017	7 July 2020	Ratification
Gambia, The	20 September 2017	26 September 2018	Ratification
Ghana	20 September 2017	26 September 2025	Ratification
Grenada	26 September 2019	20 June 2022	Ratification
Guatemala	20 September 2017	13 June 2022	Ratification
Guinea-Bissau	26 September 2018	15 December 2021	Ratification
Guyana	20 September 2017	20 September 2017	Ratification
Holy See (Note: United Nations non-member observer state)	20 September 2017	20 September 2017	Ratification
Honduras	20 September 2017	24 October 2020	Ratification
Indonesia	20 September 2017	24 September 2024	Ratification
Ireland	20 September 2017	6 August 2020	Ratification
Jamaica	8 December 2017	23 October 2020	Ratification
Kazakhstan	2 March 2018	29 August 2019	Ratification
Kiribati	20 September 2017	26 September 2019	Ratification
Laos	21 September 2017	26 September 2019	Ratification
Lesotho	26 September 2019	6 June 2020	Ratification
Malawi	20 September 2017	29 June 2022	Ratification
Malaysia	20 September 2017	30 September 2020	Ratification
Maldives	26 September 2019	26 September 2019	Ratification
Malta	25 August 2020	21 September 2020	Ratification
Mexico	20 September 2017	16 January 2018	Ratification
Mongolia		10 December 2021	Accession
Namibia	8 December 2017	20 March 2020	Ratification
Nauru	22 November 2019	23 October 2020	Ratification
New Zealand	20 September 2017	31 July 2018	Ratification
Nicaragua	22 September 2017	19 July 2018	Ratification
Nigeria	20 September 2017	6 August 2020	Ratification
Niue		6 August 2020	Accession
Palau	20 September 2017	3 May 2018	Ratification
Palestine	20 September 2017	22 March 2018	Ratification
Panama	20 September 2017	11 April 2019	Ratification
Paraguay	20 September 2017	23 January 2020	Ratification
Peru	20 September 2017	23 December 2021	Ratification
Philippines	20 September 2017	18 February 2021	Ratification
Saint Kitts and Nevis	26 September 2019	9 August 2020	Ratification
Saint Lucia	27 September 2018	23 January 2019	Ratification
Saint Vincent and the Grenadines	8 December 2017	31 July 2019	Ratification
Samoa	20 September 2017	26 September 2018	Ratification
San Marino	20 September 2017	26 September 2018	Ratification
Seychelles	26 September 2018	9 July 2021	Ratification
São Tomé and Príncipe	20 September 2017	15 January 2024	Ratification
Sierra Leone	22 September 2022	24 September 2024	Ratification
Solomon Islands	24 September 2024	24 September 2024	Ratification
South Africa	20 September 2017	25 February 2019	Ratification
Sri Lanka		19 September 2023	Accession
Thailand	20 September 2017	20 September 2017	Ratification
Timor-Leste	26 September 2018	20 June 2022	Ratification
Tonga		7 July 2026	Accession
Trinidad and Tobago	26 September 2019	26 September 2019	Ratification
Tuvalu	20 September 2017	12 October 2020	Ratification
Uruguay	20 September 2017	25 July 2018	Ratification
Vanuatu	20 September 2017	26 September 2018	Ratification
Venezuela	20 September 2017	27 March 2018	Ratification
Vietnam	22 September 2017	17 May 2018	Ratification

== Signatory states ==
As of September 2026, the following 26 states have signed but not ratified the TPNW.

State	Signed
Algeria	20 September 2017
Angola	27 September 2018
Bahamas	19 September 2023
Barbados	22 September 2022
Brazil	20 September 2017
Brunei Darussalam	26 September 2018
Burkina Faso	22 September 2022
Central African Republic	20 September 2017
Colombia	3 August 2018
Djibouti	9 January 2023
Equatorial Guinea	22 September 2022
Gabon	23 September 2026
Haiti	22 September 2022
Kyrgyzstan	26 September 2025
Libya	20 September 2017
Liechtenstein	20 September 2017
Madagascar	20 September 2017
Mozambique	18 August 2020
Myanmar	26 September 2018
Nepal	20 September 2017
Niger	9 December 2020
Sudan	22 July 2020
Tanzania	26 September 2019
Togo	20 September 2017
Zambia	26 September 2019
Zimbabwe	4 December 2020

== See also ==
- List of parties to the Biological Weapons Convention
- List of parties to the Chemical Weapons Convention
- List of parties to the Convention on Certain Conventional Weapons
- List of parties to the Comprehensive Nuclear-Test-Ban Treaty
- List of parties to the Treaty on the Non-Proliferation of Nuclear Weapons
- List of parties to the Ottawa Treaty
- List of parties to the Partial Nuclear Test Ban Treaty
- List of parties to weapons of mass destruction treaties
