= List of parties to the Partial Nuclear Test Ban Treaty =

Participation in the Partial Test Ban Treaty Signed and ratified Acceded or succeeded Only signed Non-signatory

The list of parties to the Partial Test Ban Treaty encompasses the states who have signed and ratified or acceded to the international agreement prohibiting all test detonations of nuclear weapons except underground.

On August 5, 1963, the Partial Test Ban Treaty (PTBT) was opened for signature. The principal state authors (the Soviet Union, the United Kingdom, and the United States) signed the treaty that day. The PTBT came into force and closed for signature on October 10, 1963, with the ratification by the three principal states. Since then, states that did not sign the treaty can now only accede or succeed to it.

As of October 2018, 125 UN member states have ratified or acceded to the treaty, most recently Montenegro on 3 June 2006. In addition, the Republic of China (Taiwan), which is currently only recognized by 11 UN member states, ratified the treaty prior to the United Nations General Assembly's vote to transfer China's seat to the People's Republic of China (PRC) in 1971. A further 10 states have signed but not ratified the treaty. The instrument of ratification, accession, or succession is deposited at the respective capitals of the principal states of the treaty: Moscow, London, and Washington, D.C.

== Ratified or acceded states ==
Multiple dates indicate the different days in which states submitted their signature or deposition, which varied by location. This location is noted by: (L) for London, (M) for Moscow, and (W) for Washington.

| State | Signed | Deposited | Method |
|---|---|---|---|
| Afghanistan | Aug 8, 1963 (L, M, W) | Mar 12, 1964 (L); Mar 13, 1964 (W); Mar 23, 1964 (M) | Ratification as Kingdom of Afghanistan |
| Antigua and Barbuda | | Nov 16, 1988 (W); Dec 26, 1988 (M); Jan 26, 1989 (L) | Succession from United Kingdom |
| Argentina | Aug 8, 1963 (W); Aug 9, 1963 (L, M) | Nov 14, 1986 (L); Nov 17, 1986 (M); Nov 21, 1986 (W) | Ratification |
| Armenia | | Jun 7, 1994 (M, W) | Accession |
| Australia | Aug 8, 1963 (L, M, W) | Nov 12, 1963 (L, M, W) | Ratification |
| Austria | Sep 11, 1963 (W); Sep 12, 1963 (L, M) | Jul 17, 1964 (L, M, W) | Ratification |
| Bahamas | | Aug 11, 1976 (L); Aug 13, 1976 (W); Aug 30, 1976 (M) | Succession from United Kingdom |
| Bangladesh | | Mar 11, 1985 (M); Mar 12, 1985 (W); Mar 13, 1985 (L) | Accession |
| Belarus | Oct 8, 1963 (M) | Dec 16, 1963 (M) | Ratification as Byelorussian SSR |
| Belgium | Aug 8, 1963 (L, M, W) | Mar 1, 1966 (L, M, W) | Ratification |
| Benin | Aug 27, 1963 (W); Sep 3, 1963 (L); Oct 9, 1963 (M) | Dec 15, 1964 (W); Dec 23, 1964 (M); Apr 22, 1965 (L) | Ratification as Republic of Dahomey |
| Bhutan | | Jun 8, 1978 (W) | Accession |
| Bolivia | Aug 8, 1963 (W); Aug 21, 1963 (L, M) | Aug 4, 1965 (M, W); Jan 25, 1966 (L) | Ratification |
| Bosnia and Herzegovina | | Aug 15, 1994 (W) | Succession from SFR Yugoslavia |
| Botswana | | Jan 15, 1968 (M); Feb 14, 1968 (L); Mar 4, 1968 (W) | Succession from United Kingdom |
| Brazil | Aug 8, 1963 (L, M, W) | Dec 15, 1964 (M); Jan 15, 1965 (W); Mar 4, 1965 (L) | Ratification |
| Bulgaria | Aug 8, 1963 (L, M, W) | Nov 13, 1963 (W); Nov 21, 1963 (M); Dec 2, 1963 (L) | Ratification as People's Republic of Bulgaria |
| Canada | Aug 8, 1963 (L, M, W) | Jan 28, 1964 (L, M, W) | Ratification |
| Cape Verde | | Oct 24, 1979 (M) | Accession |
| Central African Republic | | Dec 22, 1964 (W); Aug 24, 1965 (L); Sep 25, 1965 (M) | Accession |
| Chad | Aug 26, 1963 (W) | Mar 1, 1965 (W) | Ratification |
| Chile | Aug 8, 1963 (W); Aug 9, 1963 (L, M) | Oct 6, 1965 (L) | Ratification |
| Colombia | Aug 16, 1963 (W); Aug 20, 1963 (L, M) | Oct 17, 1985 (L, W) | Ratification |
| Costa Rica | Aug 9, 1963 (L); Aug 13, 1963 (W); Aug 23, 1963 (M) | Jul 10, 1967 (W) | Ratification |
| Côte d'Ivoire | Sep 5, 1963 (W) | Feb 5, 1965 (W) | Ratification as the Republic of Ivory Coast |
| Croatia | | Jun 8, 1993 (W) | Succession from SFR Yugoslavia |
| Cyprus | Aug 8, 1963 (L, M, W) | Apr 15, 1965 (L); Apr 21, 1965 (M); May 7, 1965 (W) | Ratification |
| Czech Republic | | Jan 1, 1993 (M, W); Apr 5, 1993 (L) | Succession from Czechoslovakia; Signed Aug 8, 1963; Ratified Oct 17, 1963 |
| Democratic Republic of the Congo | Aug 9, 1963 (L, W); Aug 12, 1963 (M) | Oct 28, 1965 (W) | Ratification |
| Denmark | Aug 9, 1963 (L, M, W) | Jan 15, 1964 (L, M, W) | Ratification |
| Dominican Republic | Sep 16, 1963 (W); Sep 17, 1963 (L, M) | Jun 3, 1964 (M); Jun 18, 1964 (L); Jul 22, 1964 (W) | Ratification |
| Ecuador | Sep 27, 1963 (W); Oct 1, 1963 (L, W) | May 6, 1964 (W); May 8, 1964 (L); Nov 13, 1964 (M) | Ratification |
| Egypt | Aug 8, 1963 (L, M, W) | Jan 10, 1964 (L, M, W) | Ratification as the United Arab Republic |
| El Salvador | Aug 21, 1963 (W); Aug 22, 1963 (L, M) | Dec 3, 1964 (W); Dec 7, 1964 (L); Feb 9, 1965 (M) | Ratification |
| Equatorial Guinea | | Jan 16, 1989 (M) | Accession |
| Fiji | | Jul 14, 1972 (M); Jul 18, 1972 (W); Aug 14, 1972 (L) | Succession from United Kingdom |
| Finland | Aug 8, 1963 (L, M, W) | Jan 9, 1964 (L, M, W) | Ratification |
| Gabon | Sep 10, 1963 (W) | Feb 20, 1964 (W); Mar 4, 1964 (L); Mar 9, 1964 (M) | Ratification |
| Gambia | | Apr 27, 1965 (M, W); May 6, 1965 (L) | Succession from United Kingdom |
| Germany | Aug 19, 1963 (L, M, W) | Dec 1, 1964 (L, W) | Ratification as West Germany; Also East Germany; Signed Aug 8, 1963; Ratified Dec 30, 1963 |
| Ghana | Aug 9, 1963 (W); Sep 4, 1963 (L, M) | Nov 27, 1963 (L); Jan 9, 1964 (W); May 31, 1965 (M) | Ratification |
| Greece | Aug 8, 1963 (W); Aug 9, 1963 (L, M) | Dec 18, 1963 (L, M, W) | Ratification as Kingdom of Greece |
| Guatemala | Sep 23, 1963 (W) | Jan 6, 1964 (W) | Ratification |
| Guinea-Bissau | | Aug 20, 1976 (M) | Accession |
| Honduras | Aug 8, 1963 (W); Aug 15, 1963 (L, M) | Oct 2, 1964 (W); Dec 2, 1964 (L) | Ratification |
| Hungary | Aug 8, 1963 (L, M, W) | Oct 21, 1963 (L, M); Oct 22, 1963 (W) | Ratification as the People's Republic of Hungary |
| Iceland | Aug 12, 1963 (L, M, W) | Apr 29, 1964 (L, M, W) | Ratification |
| India | Aug 8, 1963 (L, M, W) | Oct 10, 1963 (L); Oct 14, 1963 (M); Oct 18, 1963 (W) | Ratification |
| Indonesia | Aug 23, 1963 (L, M, W) | Jan 20, 1964 (M); Jan 27, 1964 (W); May 8, 1964 (L) | Ratification |
| Iran | Aug 8, 1963 (L, M, W) | May 5, 1964 (L, M, W) | Ratification as the Empire of Iran |
| Iraq | Aug 13, 1963 (L, M, W) | Nov 30, 1964 (L); Dec 1, 1964 (W); Dec 3, 1964 (M) | Ratification |
| Ireland | Aug 8, 1963 (L, M, W) | Dec 18, 1963 (L, W); Dec 20, 1963 (M) | Ratification |
| Israel | Aug 8, 1963 (L, M, W) | Jan 15, 1964 (L, W); Jan 28, 1964 (M) | Ratification |
| Italy | Aug 8, 1963 (L, M, W) | Dec 10, 1964 (L, M, W) | Ratification |
| Jamaica | Aug 13, 1963 (L, M, W) | Nov 11, 1991 (M); Nov 22, 1991 (W) | Ratification |
| Japan | Aug 14, 1963 (L, M, W) | Jun 15, 1964 (L, M, W) | Ratification |
| Jordan | Aug 12, 1963 (L, M, W) | May 29, 1964 (L); Jul 7, 1964 (M); Jul 10, 1964 (W) | Ratification |
| Kenya | | Jun 10, 1965 (L); Jun 11, 1965 (W); Jun 30, 1965 (M) | Accession |
| Kuwait | Aug 20, 1963 (L, M, W) | May 20, 1965 (W); May 21, 1965 (L); Jun 17, 1965 (M) | Ratification |
| Laos | Aug 12, 1963 (L, M, W) | Feb 10, 1965 (L); Feb 12, 1965 (W); Apr 7, 1965 (M) | Ratification as the Kingdom of Laos |
| Lebanon | Aug 12, 1963 (W); Aug 13, 1963 (L, M) | May 14, 1965 (W); May 20, 1965 (L); Jun 4, 1965 (M) | Ratification |
| Liberia | Aug 8, 1963 (W); Aug 16, 1963 (L, M) | May 19, 1964 (W); May 22, 1964 (L); Jun 16, 1964 (M) | Ratification |
| Libya | Aug 9, 1963 (L, M); Aug 16, 1963 (W) | Jul 15, 1968 (L) | Ratification as the Kingdom of Libya |
| Luxembourg | Aug 13, 1963 (L); Sep 3, 1963 (W); Sep 13, 1963 (M) | Feb 10, 1965 (L, M, W) | Ratification |
| Madagascar | Sep 23, 1963 (W) | Mar 15, 1965 (W) | Ratification |
| Malawi | | Nov 26, 1964 (M); Nov 29, 1964 (W); Jan 7, 1965 (L) | Succession from United Kingdom |
| Malaysia | Aug 8, 1963 (W); Aug 12, 1963 (L); Aug 21, 1963 (M) | Jul 15, 1964 (M); Jul 16, 1964 (L, W) | Ratification |
| Malta | | Nov 25, 1964 (M, W); Dec 1, 1964 (L) | Succession from United Kingdom |
| Mauritania | Sep 13, 1963 (W); Sep 17, 1963 (L, M) | Apr 6, 1964 (W); Apr 15, 1964 (L); Apr 28, 1964 (M) | Ratification |
| Mauritius | | Apr 30, 1969 (M, W); May 12, 1969 (L) | Succession from United Kingdom |
| Mexico | Aug 8, 1963 (L, M, W) | Dec 27, 1963 (L, M, W) | Ratification |
| Mongolia | Aug 8, 1963 (L, M) | Nov 1, 1963 (M); Nov 7, 1963 (L) | Ratification as the Mongolian People's Republic |
| Montenegro | | Jun 3, 2006 (M); Dec 12, 2006 (L) | Succession from Serbia and Montenegro (Note: Montenegro's effective date of succession was 3 June 2006.) |
| Morocco | Aug 27, 1963 (W); Aug 30, 1963 (L, M) | Feb 1, 1966 (L); Feb 18, 1966 (M); Feb 21, 1966 (W) | Ratification |
| Myanmar | Aug 14, 1963 (L, M, W) | Nov 15, 1963 (L, M, W) | Ratification as Union of Burma |
| Nepal | Aug 26, 1963 (L, M); Aug 30, 1963 (W) | Oct 7, 1964 (L, M, W) | Ratification as the Kingdom of Nepal |
| Netherlands | Aug 9, 1963 (L, M, W) | Sep 14, 1964 (L, M, W) | Ratification |
| New Zealand | Aug 8, 1963 (L, M, W) | Oct 10, 1963 (L, W); Oct 16, 1963 (M) | Ratification |
| Nicaragua | Aug 13, 1963 (L, M, W) | Jan 26, 1965 (L); Feb 26, 1965 (M, W) | Ratification |
| Niger | Sep 24, 1963 (L, M, W) | Jul 3, 1964 (M); Jul 6, 1964 (L); Jul 9, 1964 (W) | Ratification |
| Nigeria | Sep 2, 1963 (L); Sep 4, 1963 (W); Sep 2, 1964 (M) | Feb 17, 1967 (L); Feb 25, 1967 (M); Feb 28, 1967 (W) | Ratification |
| Norway | Aug 9, 1963 (L, M, W) | Nov 21, 1963 (L, M, W) | Ratification |
| Pakistan | Aug 14, 1963 (L, M, W) | Mar 3, 1988 (L) | Ratification |
| Panama | Sep 20, 1963 (W) | Feb 24, 1966 (W) | Ratification |
| Papua New Guinea | | Oct 27, 1980 (L); Nov 13, 1980 (M); Mar 16, 1981 (W) | Succession from Australia |
| Peru | Aug 23, 1963 (L, M, W) | Jul 20, 1964 (W); Aug 4, 1964 (L); Aug 21, 1964 (M) | Ratification |
| Philippines | Aug 8, 1963 (L, M, W) | Nov 10, 1965 (L); Nov 15, 1965 (W); Feb 8, 1966 (M) | Ratification |
| Poland | Aug 8, 1963 (L, M, W) | Oct 14, 1963 (L, M, W) | Ratification as People's Republic of Poland |
| Romania | Aug 8, 1963 (L, M, W) | Dec 12, 1963 (L, M, W) | Ratification as People's Republic of Romania |
| Russia | Aug 5, 1963 (L, M, W) | Oct 10, 1963 (L, M, W) | Ratification as Soviet Union |
| Rwanda | Sep 19, 1963 (W) | Oct 22, 1963 (L); Dec 16, 1963 (M); Dec 27, 1963 (W) | Ratification |
| Samoa | Sep 5, 1963 (L, M); Sep 6, 1963 (W) | Jan 15, 1965 (W); Jan 19, 1965 (L); Feb 8, 1965 (M) | Ratification as Western Samoa |
| San Marino | Sep 17, 1963 (W); Sep 20, 1963 (L, M) | Jul 3, 1964 (L); Jul 9, 1964 (W); Nov 27, 1964 (M) | Ratification |
| Senegal | Sep 20, 1963 (W); Sep 23, 1963 (L, M) | May 6, 1964 (L); May 12, 1964 (M); Jun 2, 1964 (W) | Ratification |
| Serbia | Aug 8, 1963 (M) | Jan 31, 1964 (M) | Ratification as SFR Yugoslavia; Succession as FR Yugoslavia (later known as Serbia and Montenegro); Succession as Serbia on Jun 3, 2006 |
| Seychelles | | Mar 12, 1985 (L); Mar 14, 1985 (M); Apr 8, 1985 (W) | Accession |
| Sierra Leone | Sep 4, 1963 (L, M); Sep 11, 1963 (W) | Feb 21, 1964 (L); Mar 4, 1964 (W); Apr 29, 1964 (M) | Ratification |
| Singapore | | Jul 12, 1968 (M, W); Jul 23, 1968 (L) | Succession from Malaysia |
| Slovakia | | Jan 1, 1993 (M, W); May 17, 1993 (L) | Succession from Czechoslovakia; Signed Aug 8, 1963; Ratified Oct 14, 1963 |
| Slovenia | | Apr 7, 1992 (L); Aug 20, 1992 (W) | Succession from SFR Yugoslavia |
| South Africa | | Oct 10, 1963 (L, W); Nov 22, 1963 (M) | Accession |
| South Korea | Aug 30, 1963 (L, W) | Jul 24, 1964 (L, W) | Ratification |
| Spain | Aug 13, 1963 (W); Aug 14, 1963 (L) | Dec 17, 1964 (L, W) | Ratification as Spanish State |
| Sri Lanka | Aug 22, 1963 (L, W); Aug 23, 1963 (M) | Feb 5, 1964 (W); Feb 12, 1964 (M); Feb 13, 1964 (L) | Ratification as Dominion of Ceylon |
| Sudan | Aug 9, 1963 (L, M, W) | Mar 4, 1966 (L, W); Mar 28, 1966 (M) | Ratification |
| Suriname | | Jan 6, 1993 (L); Apr 9, 1993 (W) | Accession |
| Swaziland | | May 29, 1969 (L, W); Jun 3, 1969 (M) | Accession |
| Sweden | Aug 12, 1963 (L, M, W) | Dec 9, 1963 (L, M, W) | Ratification |
| Switzerland | Aug 26, 1963 (L, M, W) | Jan 16, 1964 (L, M, W) | Ratification |
| Syria | Aug 13, 1963 (L, M, W) | Jun 1, 1964 (L, M, W) | Ratification |
| Tanzania | Sep 16, 1963 (L); Sep 18, 1963 (W); Sep 20, 1963 (M) | Feb 6, 1964 (L) | Ratification |
| Thailand | Aug 8, 1963 (L, M, W) | Nov 15, 1963 (L); Nov 21, 1963 (M); Nov 29, 1963 (W) | Ratification |
| Togo | Sep 18, 1963 (W) | Dec 7, 1964 (W) | Ratification |
| Tonga | | Jun 22, 1971 (M); Jul 7, 1971 (L, W) | Succession from United Kingdom |
| Trinidad and Tobago | Aug 12, 1963 (L, M, W) | Jul 14, 1964 (W); Jul 16, 1964 (L); Aug 6, 1964 (M) | Ratification |
| Tunisia | Aug 8, 1963 (W); Aug 12, 1963 (L, M) | May 26, 1965 (L, M); Jun 3, 1965 (W) | Ratification |
| Turkey | Aug 9, 1963 (L, M, W) | Jul 8, 1965 (L, M, W) | Ratification |
| Uganda | Aug 29, 1963 (L, W) | Mar 24, 1964 (L); Apr 2, 1964 (W) | Ratification |
| Ukraine | Oct 8, 1963 (M) | Dec 30, 1963 (M) | Ratification as Ukrainian SSR |
| United Kingdom | Aug 5, 1963 (L, M, W) | Oct 10, 1963 (L, M, W) | Ratification |
| United States | Aug 5, 1963 (L, M, W) | Oct 10, 1963 (L, M, W) | Ratification |
| Uruguay | Aug 12, 1963 (W); Sep 27, 1963 (L, M) | Feb 25, 1969 (L) | Ratification |
| Venezuela | Aug 16, 1963 (W); Aug 20, 1963 (L, M) | Feb 22, 1965 (M); Mar 3, 1965 (L); Mar 29, 1965 (W) | Ratification |
| Yemen | | Jun 1, 1979 (M) | Accession as South Yemen; Also signed by North Yemen on Sep 6, 1963 prior to Yemeni unification |
| Zambia | | Jan 11, 1965 (M, W); Feb 8, 1965 (L) | Succession from United Kingdom |

== Partially recognized state abiding by treaty ==
The Republic of China (Taiwan), which is currently only recognized by 11 UN member states, ratified the treaty prior to the United Nations General Assembly's vote to transfer China's seat to the People's Republic of China (PRC) in 1971. The ROC has committed itself to continue to adhere to the requirements of the treaty, and the United States has declared that they still consider them to be "bound by its obligations".

| State | Signed | Deposited | Method |
|---|---|---|---|
| Republic of China | Aug 23, 1963 (M) | May 18, 1964 (M) | Ratification |

== Signatory states ==
The following ten states have signed but not ratified the treaty.

| State | Signed |
|---|---|
| Algeria | Aug 14, 1963 (L, M, W) |
| Burkina Faso | Aug 30, 1963 (W) |
| Burundi | Oct 4, 1963 (W) |
| Cameroon | Aug 27, 1963 (W); Sep 6, 1963 (L) |
| Ethiopia | Aug 9, 1963 (L, M, W) |
| Haiti | Oct 9, 1963 (W) |
| Mali | Aug 23, 1963 (L, M, W) |
| Paraguay | Aug 15, 1963 (L, M, W) |
| Portugal | Oct 9, 1963 (L, W) |
| Somalia | Aug 19, 1963 (M, W) |

== Non-signatory states ==
The remaining UN member states and UN observer states, which have not signed the treaty, are:

- Albania
- Andorra
- Angola
- Azerbaijan
- Bahrain
- Barbados
- Belize
- Brunei
- Cambodia
- P.R. China
- Comoros
- Congo
- Cuba
- Djibouti
- Dominica
- Eritrea
- Estonia
- France
- Georgia
- Grenada
- Guinea
- Guyana
- Kazakhstan
- Kiribati
- Kyrgyzstan
- Latvia
- Lesotho
- Liechtenstein
- Lithuania
- Maldives
- Marshall Islands
- Micronesia
- Moldova
- Monaco
- Mozambique
- Namibia
- Nauru
- North Korea
- North Macedonia
- Oman
- Palau
- Palestine
- Qatar
- St. Kitts/Nevis
- Saint Lucia
- St. Vincent
- São Tomé/Príncipe
- Saudi Arabia
- Solomon Islands
- South Sudan
- Tajikistan
- Timor-Leste
- Turkmenistan
- Tuvalu
- United Arab Emirates
- Uzbekistan
- Vanuatu
- Vatican City
- Vietnam (Note: Signed by the Republic of Vietnam on 1 October 1963, but following the victory by the Democratic Republic of Vietnam in the Vietnam War, the reunified Socialist Republic of Vietnam renounced all treaty actions performed by the Republic of Vietnam.)
- Zimbabwe

== See also ==
- List of parties to the Biological Weapons Convention
- List of parties to the Chemical Weapons Convention
- List of parties to the Convention on Certain Conventional Weapons
- List of parties to the Comprehensive Nuclear-Test-Ban Treaty
- List of parties to the Ottawa Treaty
- List of parties to the Treaty on the Non-Proliferation of Nuclear Weapons
- List of parties to the Treaty on the Prohibition of Nuclear Weapons
