= List of parties to the Ottawa Treaty =

Participation in the Ottawa Treaty Signed and ratified Acceded or succeeded Withdrawn

This is a list of states that have signed and ratified or acceded to the Ottawa Treaty (also known as the Mine Ban Treaty). The treaty, which outlaws anti-personnel mines, was opened for signature on December 3, 1997. Canada, Ireland, and Mauritius became the first states to ratify the treaty that same day. The treaty came into force and closed for signature on March 1, 1999 with the ratification by 40 states. Since then, states that did not sign the treaty can now only accede to it. Currently, 162 states have ratified or acceded to the treaty, the most recent being Lebanon that acceded the treaty on May 1, 2026. Although at the same time period, five nations withdrew completely from the treaty.

== States parties ==
The following states have either signed and ratified or acceded to the treaty.

State	Signed	Deposited	Method
Afghanistan		Sep 11, 2002	Accession
Albania	Sep 8, 1998	Feb 29, 2000	Ratification
Algeria	Dec 3, 1997	Oct 9, 2001	Ratification
Andorra	Dec 3, 1997	Jun 29, 1998	Ratification
Angola	Dec 4, 1997	Jul 5, 2002	Ratification
Antigua and Barbuda	Dec 3, 1997	May 3, 1999	Ratification
Argentina	Dec 4, 1997	Sep 14, 1999	Ratification
Australia	Dec 3, 1997	Jan 14, 1999	Ratification
Austria	Dec 3, 1997	Jun 29, 1998	Ratification
Bahamas	Dec 3, 1997	Jul 31, 1998	Ratification
Bangladesh	May 7, 1998	Sep 6, 2000	Ratification
Barbados	Dec 3, 1997	Jan 26, 1999	Ratification
Belarus		Sep 3, 2003	Accession
Belgium	Dec 3, 1997	Sep 4, 1998	Ratification
Belize	Feb 27, 1998	Apr 23, 1998	Ratification
Benin	Dec 3, 1997	Sep 25, 1998	Ratification
Bhutan		Aug 18, 2005	Accession
Bolivia	Dec 3, 1997	Jun 9, 1998	Ratification
Bosnia and Herzegovina	Dec 3, 1997	Sep 8, 1998	Ratification
Botswana	Dec 3, 1997	Mar 1, 2000	Ratification
Brazil	Dec 3, 1997	Apr 30, 1999	Ratification
Brunei	Dec 4, 1997	Apr 24, 2006	Ratification
Bulgaria	Dec 3, 1997	Sep 4, 1998	Ratification
Burkina Faso	Dec 3, 1997	Sep 16, 1998	Ratification
Burundi	Dec 3, 1997	Oct 22, 2003	Ratification
Cape Verde	Dec 4, 1997	May 14, 2001	Ratification
Cambodia	Dec 3, 1997	Jul 28, 1999	Ratification
Cameroon	Dec 3, 1997	Sep 19, 2002	Ratification
Canada	Dec 3, 1997	Dec 3, 1997	Ratification
Central African Republic		Nov 8, 2002	Accession
Chad	Jul 6, 1998	May 6, 1999	Ratification
Chile	Dec 3, 1997	Sep 10, 2001	Ratification
Colombia	Dec 3, 1997	Sep 6, 2000	Ratification
Comoros		Sep 19, 2002	Accession
Congo		May 4, 2001	Accession
Cook Islands	Dec 3, 1997	Mar 15, 2006	Ratification
Costa Rica	Dec 3, 1997	Mar 17, 1999	Ratification
Ivory Coast	Dec 3, 1997	Jun 30, 2000	Ratification
Croatia	Dec 4, 1997	May 20, 1998	Ratification
Cyprus	Dec 4, 1997	Jan 17, 2003	Ratification
Czech Republic	Dec 3, 1997	Oct 26, 1999	Ratification
DR Congo		May 2, 2002	Accession
Denmark	Dec 4, 1997	Jun 8, 1998	Ratification
Djibouti	Dec 3, 1997	May 18, 1998	Ratification
Dominica	Dec 3, 1997	Mar 26, 1999	Ratification
Dominican Republic	Dec 3, 1997	Jun 30, 2000	Ratification
Ecuador	Dec 4, 1997	Apr 29, 1999	Ratification
El Salvador	Dec 4, 1997	Jan 27, 1999	Ratification
Equatorial Guinea		Sep 16, 1998	Accession
Eritrea		Aug 27, 2001	Accession
Ethiopia	Dec 3, 1997	Dec 17, 2004	Ratification
Fiji	Dec 3, 1997	Jun 10, 1998	Ratification
France	Dec 3, 1997	Jul 23, 1998	Ratification
Gabon	Dec 3, 1997	Sep 8, 2000	Ratification
Gambia	Dec 4, 1997	Sep 23, 2002	Ratification
Germany	Dec 3, 1997	Jul 23, 1998	Ratification
Ghana	Dec 4, 1997	Jun 30, 2000	Ratification
Greece	Dec 3, 1997	Sep 25, 2003	Ratification
Grenada	Dec 3, 1997	Aug 19, 1998	Ratification
Guatemala	Dec 3, 1997	Mar 26, 1999	Ratification
Guinea	Dec 4, 1997	Oct 8, 1998	Ratification
Guinea-Bissau	Dec 3, 1997	May 22, 2001	Ratification
Guyana	Dec 4, 1997	Aug 5, 2003	Ratification
Haiti	Dec 3, 1997	Feb 15, 2006	Ratification
Holy See	Dec 4, 1997	Feb 17, 1998	Ratification
Honduras	Dec 3, 1997	Sep 24, 1998	Ratification
Hungary	Dec 3, 1997	Apr 6, 1998	Ratification
Iceland	Dec 4, 1997	May 5, 1999	Ratification
Indonesia	Dec 4, 1997	Feb 16, 2007	Ratification
Iraq		Aug 15, 2007	Accession
Ireland	Dec 3, 1997	Dec 3, 1997	Ratification
Italy	Dec 3, 1997	Apr 23, 1999	Ratification
Jamaica	Dec 3, 1997	Jul 17, 1998	Ratification
Japan	Dec 3, 1997	Sep 30, 1998	Acceptance
Jordan	Aug 11, 1998	Nov 13, 1998	Ratification
Kenya	Dec 5, 1997	Jan 23, 2001	Ratification
Kiribati		Sep 7, 2000	Accession
Kuwait		Jul 31, 2007	Accession
Lebanon		May 1, 2026	Accession
Lesotho	Dec 4, 1997	Dec 2, 1998	Ratification
Liberia		Dec 23, 1999	Accession
Liechtenstein	Dec 3, 1997	Oct 5, 1999	Ratification
Luxembourg	Dec 4, 1997	Jun 14, 1999	Ratification
North Macedonia		Sep 9, 1998	Accession
Madagascar	Dec 4, 1997	Sep 16, 1999	Ratification
Malawi	Dec 4, 1997	Aug 13, 1998	Ratification
Malaysia	Dec 3, 1997	Apr 22, 1999	Ratification
Maldives	Oct 1, 1998	Sep 7, 2000	Ratification
Mali	Dec 3, 1997	Jun 2, 1998	Ratification
Malta	Dec 4, 1997	May 7, 2001	Ratification
Marshall Islands	Dec 4, 1997	Mar 13, 2025	Ratification
Mauritania	Dec 3, 1997	Jul 21, 2000	Ratification
Mauritius	Dec 3, 1997	Dec 3, 1997	Ratification
Mexico	Dec 3, 1997	Jun 9, 1998	Ratification
Moldova	Dec 3, 1997	Sep 8, 2000	Ratification
Monaco	Dec 4, 1997	Nov 17, 1998	Ratification
Montenegro		Oct 23, 2006	Succession
Mozambique	Dec 3, 1997	Aug 25, 1998	Ratification
Namibia	Dec 3, 1997	Sep 21, 1998	Ratification
Nauru		Aug 7, 2000	Accession
Netherlands	Dec 3, 1997	Apr 12, 1999	Acceptance
New Zealand	Dec 3, 1997	Jan 27, 1999	Ratification
Nicaragua	Dec 4, 1997	Nov 30, 1998	Ratification
Niger	Dec 4, 1997	Mar 23, 1999	Ratification
Nigeria		Sep 27, 2001	Accession
Niue	Dec 3, 1997	Apr 15, 1998	Ratification
Norway	Dec 3, 1997	Jul 9, 1998	Ratification
Oman		Aug 20, 2014	Accession
Palau		Nov 19, 2007	Accession
Palestine		Dec 29, 2017	Accession
Panama	Dec 4, 1997	Oct 7, 1998	Ratification
Papua New Guinea		Jun 28, 2004	Accession
Paraguay	Dec 3, 1997	Nov 13, 1998	Ratification
Peru	Dec 3, 1997	Jun 17, 1998	Ratification
Philippines	Dec 3, 1997	Feb 15, 2000	Ratification
Portugal	Dec 3, 1997	Feb 19, 1999	Ratification
Qatar	Dec 4, 1997	Oct 13, 1998	Ratification
Romania	Dec 3, 1997	Nov 30, 2000	Ratification
Rwanda	Dec 3, 1997	Jun 8, 2000	Ratification
Saint Kitts and Nevis	Dec 3, 1997	Dec 2, 1998	Ratification
Saint Lucia	Dec 3, 1997	Apr 13, 1999	Ratification
Saint Vincent and the Grenadines	Dec 3, 1997	Aug 1, 2001	Ratification
Samoa	Dec 3, 1997	Jul 23, 1998	Ratification
San Marino	Dec 3, 1997	Mar 18, 1998	Ratification
São Tomé and Príncipe	Apr 30, 1998	Mar 31, 2003	Ratification
Senegal	Dec 3, 1997	Sep 24, 1998	Ratification
Serbia		Sep 18, 2003	Accession
Seychelles	Dec 4, 1997	Jun 2, 2000	Ratification
Sierra Leone	Jul 29, 1998	Apr 25, 2001	Ratification
Slovakia	Dec 3, 1997	Feb 25, 1999	Approval
Slovenia	Dec 3, 1997	Oct 27, 1998	Ratification
Solomon Islands	Dec 4, 1997	Jan 26, 1999	Ratification
Somalia		Apr 16, 2012	Accession
South Africa	Dec 3, 1997	Jun 26, 1998	Ratification
South Sudan		July 9, 2011	Succession
Spain	Dec 3, 1997	Jan 19, 1999	Ratification
Sri Lanka		Dec 13, 2017	Accession
Sudan	Dec 4, 1997	Oct 13, 2003	Ratification
Suriname	Dec 4, 1997	May 23, 2002	Ratification
Swaziland	Dec 4, 1997	Dec 22, 1998	Ratification
Sweden	Dec 4, 1997	Nov 30, 1998	Ratification
Switzerland	Dec 3, 1997	Mar 24, 1998	Ratification
Tajikistan		Oct 12, 1999	Accession
Tanzania	Dec 3, 1997	Nov 13, 2000	Ratification
Thailand	Dec 3, 1997	Nov 27, 1998	Ratification
Timor-Leste		May 7, 2003	Accession
Togo	Dec 4, 1997	Mar 9, 2000	Ratification
Tonga		Jun 25, 2025	Accession
Trinidad and Tobago	Dec 4, 1997	Apr 27, 1998	Ratification
Tunisia	Dec 4, 1997	Jul 9, 1999	Ratification
Turkey	March 26, 2004	Sep 25, 2003	Accession
Turkmenistan	Dec 3, 1997	Jan 19, 1998	Ratification
Tuvalu		Sep 13, 2011	Accession
Uganda	Dec 3, 1997	Feb 25, 1999	Ratification
Ukraine (Note: In June 2025, Ukraine announced the intent to withdraw from the treaty, but did not formally deposit the notification yet.)	Feb 24, 1999	Dec 27, 2005	Ratification
United Kingdom	Dec 3, 1997	Jul 31, 1998	Ratification
Uruguay	Dec 3, 1997	Jun 7, 2001	Ratification
Vanuatu	Dec 4, 1997	Sep 16, 2005	Ratification
Venezuela	Dec 3, 1997	Apr 14, 1999	Ratification
Yemen	Dec 4, 1997	Sep 1, 1998	Ratification
Zambia	Dec 12, 1997	Feb 23, 2001	Ratification
Zimbabwe	Dec 3, 1997	Jun 18, 1998	Ratification

== Former parties ==
The following states formally began or completed the withdrawal from the treaty:

State	Signed	Deposited	Withdrawal notification	Withdrawal completed
Estonia		May 12, 2004	Jun 27, 2025	Dec 27, 2025
Finland		Jan 9, 2012	Jul 10, 2025	Jan 10, 2026
Latvia		Jul 1, 2005	Jun 27, 2025	Dec 27, 2025
Lithuania	Feb 26, 1999	May 12, 2003	Jun 27, 2025	Dec 27, 2025
Poland	Dec 4, 1997	Dec 27, 2012	Aug 20, 2025	Feb 20, 2026

== Non-signatory states ==
- Armenia
- Azerbaijan
- Bahrain
- China
- Cuba
- Egypt
- Federated States of Micronesia
- Georgia
- India
- Iran
- Israel
- Kazakhstan
- North Korea
- South Korea
- Kyrgyzstan
- Laos
- Libya
- Mongolia
- Morocco
- Myanmar
- Nepal
- Pakistan
- Russia
- Saudi Arabia
- Singapore
- Syria
- United Arab Emirates
- United States
- Uzbekistan
- Vietnam

== See also ==
- List of parties to the Biological Weapons Convention
- List of parties to the Chemical Weapons Convention
- List of parties to the Convention on Certain Conventional Weapons
- List of parties to the Comprehensive Nuclear-Test-Ban Treaty
- List of parties to the Partial Nuclear Test Ban Treaty
- List of parties to the Treaty on the Non-Proliferation of Nuclear Weapons
- List of parties to the Treaty on the Prohibition of Nuclear Weapons
