= Weapon of mass destruction =

Weapon that can kill many people or cause great damage

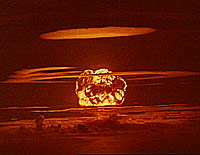
On July 20, 1956, at Bikini Atoll, the 5-megaton-yield thermonuclear weapon Redwing Tewa was detonated.

A weapon of mass destruction (WMD) is a biological, chemical, radiological, nuclear, or any other weapon that can kill or significantly harm many people or cause great damage to artificial structures (e.g., buildings), natural structures (e.g., mountains), or the biosphere. The scope and usage of the term has evolved and been disputed, often signifying more politically than technically. Originally coined in reference to aerial bombing with conventional explosives during World War II, it has later come to refer to large-scale weaponry of warfare-related technologies, primarily biological, chemical, radiological, or nuclear warfare. Protective measures against weapons of mass destruction are known as CBRN defense.

Infographic map of countries by the number of nuclear warheads Over 3,000 nuclear warheads Over 500 nuclear warheads Over 150 nuclear warheads Less than 100 nuclear warheads

The histories of biological and chemical warfare date from antiquity to the modern period, with toxic gases used on a vast scale in World War I. In World War II, the United States first developed nuclear weapons, and used them in war twice, in the atomic bombings of Hiroshima and Nagasaki. Nazi Germany's use of gases during the Holocaust killed approximately three million people, the largest death toll due to chemical weapons in history. The Empire of Japan used chemical and biological warfare on a large scale in China during the Second Sino-Japanese War, killing hundreds of thousands.

During the Cold War, the United States and Soviet Union operated the largest programs for nuclear, chemical, and biological weapons in history. The nuclear arms race saw the production of tens of thousands of thermonuclear weapons and delivery systems such as intercontinental ballistic missiles. Their chemical weapons programs focused on sarin, VX/VR, and mustard gas. Biotechnology was used by both countries to enhance pathogens, such as lethal agents that cause anthrax and incapacitating agents that cause glanders. Both countries briefly tested radiological weapons, but no state is known to have mass-produced or used them. The US Nunn–Lugar Cooperative Threat Reduction program was largely successful in securing ex-Soviet weapons of mass destruction infrastructure and personnel following the dissolution of the Soviet Union, and denuclearizing Belarus, Ukraine, and Kazakhstan.

The 1995 Tokyo subway sarin attack, September 11 attacks, and 2001 anthrax attacks brought a heightened concern of weapons of mass destruction and terrorism. Ba'athist Iraq had carried out mustard and nerve agent attacks in the Iran–Iraq War, killing thousands of civilians and troops. Following the Iraq disarmament crisis of the early 2000s, false claims by a US-led coalition that Iraq was maintaining its weapons of mass destruction programs played a major role in justifying the 2003 invasion of Iraq. Ba'athist Syria used chemical weapons during the Syrian civil war, killing thousands and prompting US-led airstrikes in 2017 and 2018.

As of 2025, nine countries possess nuclear weapons, while 185 countries pledge not to acquire them via the 1968 Non-Proliferation Treaty. The 1925 Geneva Protocol outlawed the use, but not stockpiling, of chemical and biological weapons. The 1972 Biological Weapons Convention and 1993 Chemical Weapons Convention seek complete elimination by all parties, but are challenged by violations and by a small number of non-signatory states such as Egypt, Israel, and North Korea.

== Early usage ==
The first use of the term "weapon of mass destruction" on record is by Cosmo Gordon Lang, Archbishop of Canterbury, in 1937 in reference to the bombing of Guernica, Spain:

Who can think at this present time without a sickening of the heart of the appalling slaughter, the suffering, the manifold misery brought by war to Spain and to China? Who can think without horror of what another widespread war would mean, waged as it would be with all the new weapons of mass destruction?

The term has been also modernly used for a primitive thermobaric weapon invented in 1905 by Spanish inventor Antonio Meulener, considering it possibly the first weapon of mass destruction in history.

At the time, nuclear weapons had not been developed fully. Japan conducted research on biological weapons, and chemical weapons had seen wide battlefield use in World War I. Their use was outlawed by the Geneva Protocol of 1925. Italy used mustard agent against civilians and soldiers in Ethiopia in 1935–36.

Following the atomic bombings of Hiroshima and Nagasaki that ended World War II and during the Cold War, the term came to refer more to non-conventional weapons. The application of the term to specifically nuclear and radiological weapons is traced by William Safire to the Russian phrase "Оружие массового поражения" – oruzhiye massovogo porazheniya (weapon of mass destruction).

William Safire credits James Goodby (of the Brookings Institution) with tracing what he considers the earliest known English-language use soon after the nuclear bombing of Hiroshima and Nagasaki (although it is not quite verbatim): a communique from a 15 November 1945, meeting of Harry Truman, Clement Attlee and Mackenzie King (probably drafted by Vannevar Bush, as Bush claimed in 1970) referred to "weapons adaptable to mass destruction."

Safire says Bernard Baruch used that exact phrase in 1946 (in a speech at the United Nations probably written by Herbert Bayard Swope). The phrase found its way into the very first resolution the United Nations General assembly adopted in January 1946 in London, which used the wording "the elimination from national armaments of atomic weapons and of all other weapons adaptable to mass destruction." The resolution also created the Atomic Energy Commission (predecessor of the International Atomic Energy Agency (IAEA)).

An exact use of this term was given in a lecture titled "Atomic Energy as a Contemporary Problem" by J. Robert Oppenheimer. He delivered the lecture to the Foreign Service and the State Department, on 17 September 1947.

It is a very far reaching control which would eliminate the rivalry between nations in this field, which would prevent the surreptitious arming of one nation against another, which would provide some cushion of time before atomic attack, and presumably therefore before any attack with weapons of mass destruction, and which would go a long way toward removing atomic energy at least as a source of conflict between the powers.

The term was also used in the introduction to the hugely influential U.S. government document known as NSC 68 written in 1950.

During a speech at Rice University on 12 September 1962, President John F. Kennedy spoke of not filling space "with weapons of mass destruction, but with instruments of knowledge and understanding." The following month, during a televised presentation about the Cuban Missile Crisis on 22 October 1962, Kennedy made reference to "offensive weapons of sudden mass destruction."

An early use of the exact phrase in an international treaty is in the Outer Space Treaty of 1967, but the treaty provides no definition of the phrase, and the treaty also categorically prohibits the stationing of "weapons" and the testing of "any type of weapon" in outer space, in addition to its specific prohibition against placing in orbit, or installing on celestial bodies, "any objects carrying nuclear weapons or any other kinds of weapons of mass destruction."

=== Evolution ===
During the Cold War, the term "weapons of mass destruction" was primarily a reference to nuclear weapons. At the time, in the West the euphemism "strategic weapons" was used to refer to the American nuclear arsenal. However, there is no precise definition of the "strategic" category, neither considering range nor yield of the nuclear weapon.

Subsequent to Operation Opera, the destruction of a pre-operational nuclear reactor inside Iraq by the Israeli Air Force in 1981, the Israeli prime minister, Menachem Begin, countered criticism by saying that "on no account shall we permit an enemy to develop weapons of mass destruction against the people of Israel." This policy of pre-emptive action against real or perceived weapons of mass destruction became known as the Begin Doctrine.

The term "weapons of mass destruction" continued to see periodic use, usually in the context of nuclear arms control; Ronald Reagan used it during the 1986 Reykjavík Summit, when referring to the 1967 Outer Space Treaty. Reagan's successor, George H. W. Bush, used the term in a 1989 speech to the United Nations, primarily in reference to chemical arms.

The end of the Cold War reduced U.S. reliance on nuclear weapons as a deterrent, causing it to shift its focus to disarmament. With the 1990 invasion of Kuwait and 1991 Gulf War, Iraq's nuclear, biological, and chemical weapons programs became a particular concern of the first Bush Administration. Following the war, Bill Clinton and other western politicians and media continued to use the term, usually in reference to ongoing attempts to dismantle Iraq's weapons programs.

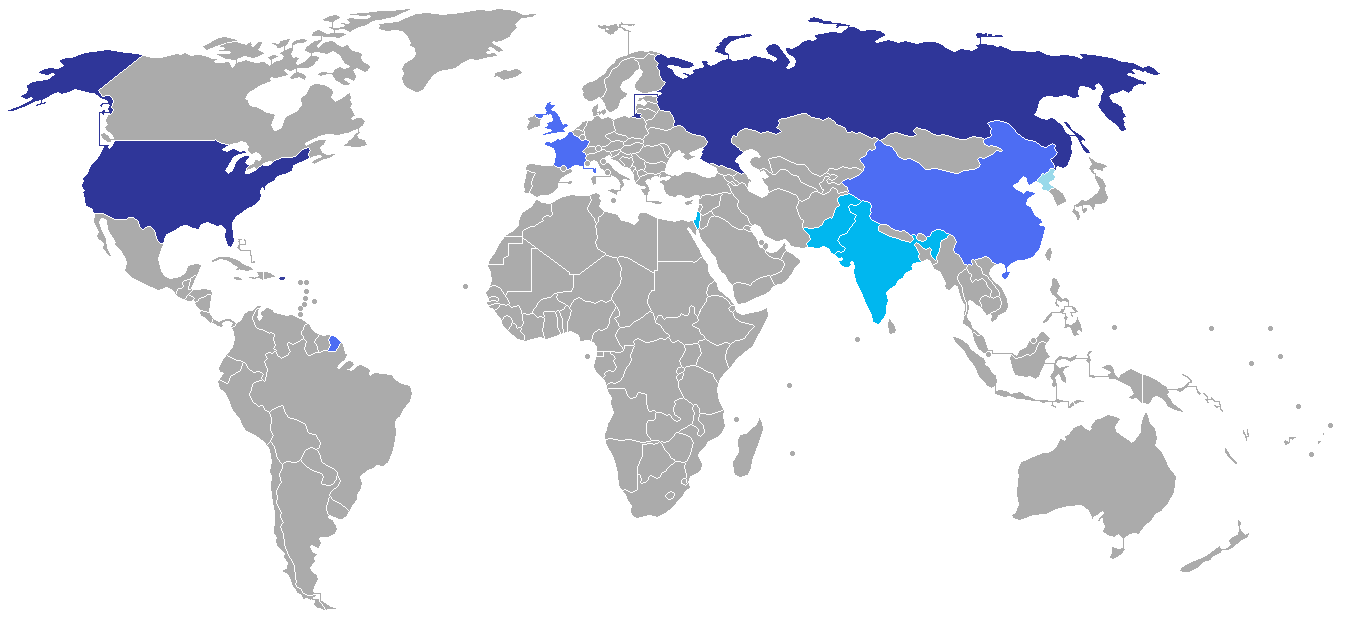
In early 2019, more than 90% of the world's 13,865 nuclear weapons were owned by Russia and the United States.

After the 11 September 2001 attacks and the 2001 anthrax attacks in the United States, an increased fear of nonconventional weapons and asymmetric warfare took hold in many countries. The fear reached a crescendo with the 2002 Iraq disarmament crisis and the alleged existence of weapons of mass destruction in Iraq that became the primary justification for the 2003 invasion of Iraq; however, American forces found none in Iraq. They found old stockpiles of chemical munitions including sarin and mustard agents, but all were considered to be unusable because of corrosion or degradation. Iraq, however, declared a chemical weapons stockpile in 2009 which U.N. personnel had secured after the 1991 Gulf War. The stockpile contained mainly chemical precursors, but some munitions remained usable.

Because of its prolific use and (worldwide) public profile during this period, the American Dialect Society voted "weapons of mass destruction" (and its abbreviation, "WMD") the word of the year in 2002, and in 2003 Lake Superior State University added WMD to its list of terms banished for "Mis-use, Over-use and General Uselessness" (and "as a card that trumps all forms of aggression").

In its criminal complaint against the main suspect of the Boston Marathon bombing of 15 April 2013, the FBI refers to a pressure-cooker improvised bomb as a "weapon of mass destruction."

There have been calls to classify at least some classes of cyber weapons as WMD, in particular those aimed to bring about large-scale (physical) destruction, such as by targeting critical infrastructure. However, some scholars have objected to classifying cyber weapons as WMD on the grounds that they "cannot [currently] directly injure or kill human beings as efficiently as guns or bombs" or clearly "meet the legal and historical definitions" of WMD.

== Definitions of the term ==
=== United States ===
==== Strategic definition ====
The most widely used definition of "weapons of mass destruction" is that of nuclear, biological, or chemical weapons (NBC) although there is no treaty or customary international law that contains an authoritative definition. Instead, international law has been used with respect to the specific categories of weapons within WMD, and not to WMD as a whole. While nuclear, chemical and biological weapons are regarded as the three major types of WMDs, some analysts have argued that radiological materials as well as missile technology and delivery systems such as aircraft and ballistic missiles could be labeled as WMDs as well.

However, there is an argument that nuclear and biological weapons do not belong in the same category as chemical and "dirty bomb" radiological weapons, which have limited destructive potential (and close to none, as far as property is concerned), whereas nuclear and biological weapons have the unique ability to kill large numbers of people with very small amounts of material, and thus could be said to belong in a class by themselves.

The NBC definition has also been used in official U.S. documents, by the U.S. President, the U.S. Central Intelligence Agency, the U.S. Department of Defense, and the U.S. Government Accountability Office.

Other documents expand the definition of WMD to also include radiological or conventional weapons. The U.S. military refers to WMD as:

Chemical, biological, radiological, or nuclear weapons capable of a high order of destruction or causing mass casualties and exclude the means of transporting or propelling the weapon where such means is a separable and divisible part from the weapon. Also called WMD.

This may also refer to nuclear ICBMs (intercontinental ballistic missiles).

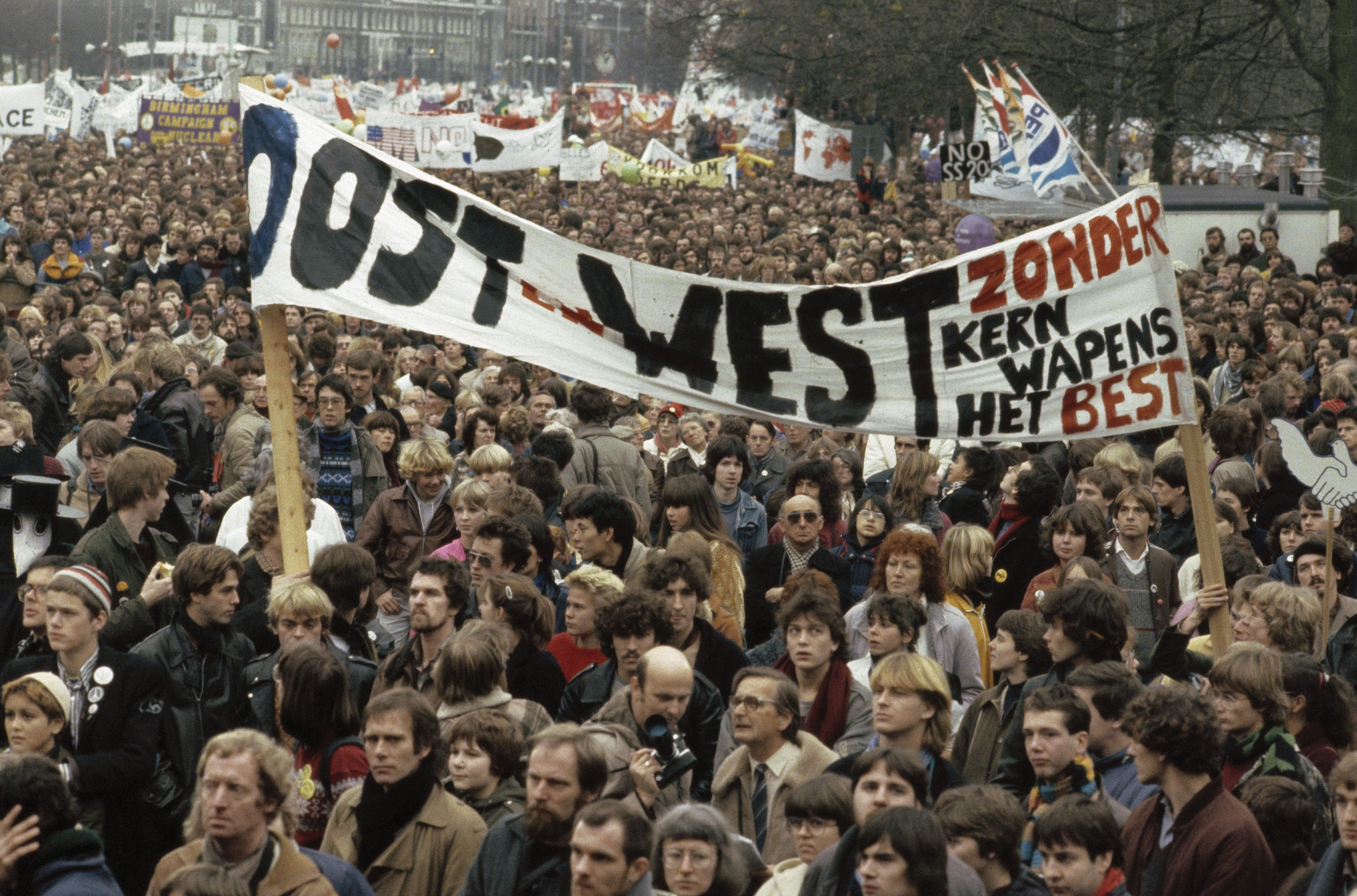
Protest in Amsterdam against the deployment of Pershing II missiles in Europe, 1981

The significance of the words separable and divisible part of the weapon is that missiles such as the Pershing II and the SCUD are considered weapons of mass destruction, while aircraft capable of carrying bombloads are not.

In 2004, the United Kingdom's Butler Review recognized the "considerable and long-standing academic debate about the proper interpretation of the phrase 'weapons of mass destruction'". The committee set out to avoid the general term but when using it, employed the definition of United Nations Security Council Resolution 687, which defined the systems which Iraq was required to abandon:

- "Nuclear weapons or nuclear-weapons-usable material or any sub-systems or components or any research, development, support or manufacturing facilities relating to [nuclear weapons].
- Chemical and biological weapons and all stocks of agents and all related subsystems and components and all research, development, support and manufacturing facilities.
- Ballistic missiles with a range greater than 150 kilometres and related major parts, and repair and production facilities."

Chemical weapons expert Gert G. Harigel considers only nuclear weapons true weapons of mass destruction, because "only nuclear weapons are completely indiscriminate by their explosive power, heat radiation and radioactivity, and only they should therefore be called a weapon of mass destruction". He prefers to call chemical and biological weapons "weapons of terror" when aimed against civilians and "weapons of intimidation" for soldiers.

Testimony of one such soldier expresses the same viewpoint. For a period of several months in the winter of 2002–2003, U.S. Deputy Secretary of Defense Paul Wolfowitz frequently used the term "weapons of mass terror", apparently also recognizing the distinction between the psychological and the physical effects of many things currently falling into the WMD category.

Gustavo Bell Lemus, the Vice President of Colombia, at 9 July 2001 United Nations Conference on the Illicit Trade in Small Arms and Light Weapons in All Its Aspects, quoted the Millennium Report of the UN Secretary-General to the General Assembly, in which Kofi Annan said that small arms could be described as WMD because the fatalities they cause "dwarf that of all other weapons systems – and in most years greatly exceed the toll of the atomic bombs that devastated Hiroshima and Nagasaki".

An additional condition often implicitly applied to WMD is that the use of the weapons must be strategic. In other words, they would be designed to "have consequences far outweighing the size and effectiveness of the weapons themselves". The strategic nature of WMD also defines their function in the military doctrine of total war as targeting the means a country would use to support and supply its war effort, specifically its population, industry, and natural resources.

Within U.S. civil defense organizations, the category is now "Chemical, biological, radiological, and nuclear" (CBRN), which defines WMD as:

(1) Any explosive, incendiary, poison gas, bomb, grenade, or rocket having a propellant charge of more than four ounces [113 g], missile having an explosive or incendiary charge of more than one-quarter ounce [7 g], or mine or device similar to the above. (2) Poison gas. (3) Any weapon involving a disease organism. (4) Any weapon that is designed to release radiation at a level dangerous to human life.

==== Military definition ====
For the general purposes of national defense, the U.S. Code defines a weapon of mass destruction as:

- any weapon or device that is intended, or has the capability, to cause death or serious bodily injury to a significant number of people through the release, dissemination, or impact of:
  - toxic or poisonous chemicals or their precursors
  - a disease organism
  - radiation or radioactivity

For the purposes of the prevention of weapons proliferation, the U.S. Code defines weapons of mass destruction as "chemical, biological, and nuclear weapons, and chemical, biological, and nuclear materials used in the manufacture of such weapons".

==== Criminal (civilian) definition ====
For the purposes of U.S. criminal law concerning terrorism, weapons of mass destruction are defined as:

- any "destructive device" defined as any explosive, incendiary, or poison gas – bomb, grenade, rocket having a propellant charge of more than four ounces, missile having an explosive or incendiary charge of more than one-quarter ounce, mine, or device similar to any of the devices described in the preceding clauses
- any weapon that is designed or intended to cause death or serious bodily injury through the release, dissemination, or impact of toxic or poisonous chemicals, or their precursors
- any weapon involving a biological agent, toxin, or vector
- any weapon that is designed to release radiation or radioactivity at a level dangerous to human life

The Federal Bureau of Investigation's definition is similar to that presented above from the terrorism statute:

- any "destructive device" as defined in Title 18 USC Section 921: any explosive, incendiary, or poison gas – bomb, grenade, rocket having a propellant charge of more than four ounces, missile having an explosive or incendiary charge of more than one-quarter ounce, mine, or device similar to any of the devices described in the preceding clauses
- any weapon designed or intended to cause death or serious bodily injury through the release, dissemination, or impact of toxic or poisonous chemicals or their precursors
- any weapon involving a disease organism
- any weapon designed to release radiation or radioactivity at a level dangerous to human life
- any device or weapon designed or intended to cause death or serious bodily injury by causing a malfunction of or destruction of an aircraft or other vehicle that carries humans or of an aircraft or other vehicle whose malfunction or destruction may cause said aircraft or other vehicle to cause death or serious bodily injury to humans who may be within range of the vector in its course of travel or the travel of its debris.

Indictments and convictions for possession and use of WMD such as truck bombs, pipe bombs, shoe bombs, and cactus needles coated with a biological toxin have been obtained under 18 USC 2332a.

As defined by 18 USC §2332 (a), a Weapon of Mass Destruction is:

- (A) any destructive device as defined in section 921 of the title;
- (B) any weapon that is designed or intended to cause death or serious bodily injury through the release, dissemination, or impact of toxic or poisonous chemicals, or their precursors;
- (C) any weapon involving a biological agent, toxin, or vector (as those terms are defined in section 178 of this title); or
- (D) any weapon that is designed to release radiation or radioactivity at a level dangerous to human life;

Under the same statute, conspiring, attempting, threatening, or using a Weapon of Mass Destruction may be imprisoned for any term of years or for life, and if resulting in death, be punishable by death or by imprisonment for any terms of years or for life. They can also be asked to pay a maximum fine of $250,000.

The Washington Post reported on 30 March 2006: "Jurors asked the judge in the death penalty trial of Zacarias Moussaoui today to define the term 'weapons of mass destruction' and were told it includes airplanes used as missiles". Moussaoui was indicted and tried for conspiracy to both destroy aircraft and use weapons of mass destruction, among others.

The surviving Boston Marathon bombing perpetrator, Dzhokhar Tsarnaev, was charged in June 2013 with the federal offense of "use of a weapon of mass destruction" after he and his brother Tamerlan Tsarnaev allegedly placed crude shrapnel bombs, made from pressure cookers packed with ball bearings and nails, near the finish line of the Boston Marathon. He was convicted in April 2015. The bombing resulted in three deaths and at least 264 injuries.

== International law ==
The development and use of WMD is governed by several international conventions and treaties.

Table legend:

- A: Use of the weapon class in combat
- T: Testing of the weapon class
- P: Possession/stockpiling/stationing/deployment of the weapon class
- : This use of this weapon class banned under some circumstances for parties
- : This use of this weapon class comprehensively banned for parties

Treaty	Year signed	Year of entry into force	Number of states parties	Prohibition									Objective
Treaty	Year signed	Year of entry into force	Number of states parties	Nuclear			Chemical			Biological			Objective
Treaty	Year signed	Year of entry into force	Number of states parties	A	T	P	A	T	P	A	T	P	Objective
Hague Convention of 1899 (II)	1899	1900	51 (list)										Ban the employment of poison or poisoned arms
Hague Convention of 1899 (IV,2)	1899	1900	35 (list)										Ban the use of projectiles that diffuse asphyxiating gases
Hague Convention of 1907 (IV)	1907	1910	43 (list)										Ban the employment of poison or poisoned arms
Geneva Protocol	1925	1928	145										Ban the use of chemical and biological weapons in international armed conflicts
Partial Nuclear Test Ban Treaty	1963	1963	126 (list)										Ban all nuclear weapons tests except for those conducted underground
Outer Space Treaty	1967	1967	111										Ban stationing of WMD in space
Nuclear Non-Proliferation Treaty (NPT)	1968	1970	190 (list)			(Note: Nuclear weapons development banned for all states except the United States, Soviet Union, United Kingdom, France, and China.)							Ban nuclear proliferation, promote nuclear disarmament
Seabed Arms Control Treaty	1971	1972	94										Ban stationing of WMD on the ocean floor
Comprehensive Nuclear-Test-Ban Treaty (CTBT)	1995	Not in force	176 (list)										Ban all nuclear weapons tests
Biological and Toxin Weapons Convention (BWC)	1972	1975	184 (list)				(Note: Toxin weapons are sometimes considered chemical weapons)						Comprehensively ban biological weapons
Chemical Weapons Convention (CWC)	1993	1997	193 (list)										Comprehensively ban chemical weapons
Treaty on the Prohibition of Nuclear Weapons (TPNW)	2017	2021	68 (list)										Comprehensively ban nuclear weapons

== Use, possession, and access ==
=== Nuclear weapons ===
US and Soviet/Russian nuclear stockpiles, 1945 to 2014

Nuclear weapons use the energy inside of an atom's nucleus to create massive explosions. This goal is achieved through nuclear fission and fusion.

Nuclear fission is when the nucleus of an atom is split into smaller nuclei. This process can be induced by shooting a neutron at the nucleus of an atom. When the neutron is absorbed by the atom, it becomes unstable, causing it to split and release energy. Modern nuclear weapons start this process by detonating chemical explosives around a pit of either uranium-235 or plutonium-239 metal. The force from this detonation is directed inwards, causing the pit of uranium or plutonium to compress to a dense point. Once the uranium/plutonium is dense enough, neutrons are then injected. This starts a fission chain reaction also known as an atomic explosion.

Nuclear fusion is essentially the opposite of fission. It is the fusing together of nuclei, not the splitting of it. When exposed to extreme pressure and temperature, some lightweight nuclei can fuse together and form heavier nuclei, releasing energy in the process. Fusion weapons (also known as “thermonuclear” or “hydrogen” weapons) use the fission process to initiate fusion. Fusion weapons use the energy released from a fission explosion to fuse hydrogen isotopes together. The energy released from these weapons creates a fireball, which reaches tens of million degrees. A temperature of this magnitude is similar to the temperature found at center of the sun; the sun runs on fusion as well.

The only country to have used a nuclear weapon in war is the United States, which dropped two atomic bombs on the Japanese cities of Hiroshima and Nagasaki during World War II.

At the start of 2024, nine states—the United States, Russia, the United Kingdom, France, China, India, Pakistan, the Democratic People’s Republic of Korea (North Korea) and Israel—together possessed approximately 12 121 nuclear weapons, of which 9585 were considered to be potentially operationally available. An estimated 3904 of these warheads were deployed with operational forces, including about 2100 that were kept in a state of high operational alert—about 100 more than the previous year.

South Africa developed a small nuclear arsenal in the 1980s but disassembled them in the early 1990s, making it the only country to have fully given up an independently developed nuclear weapons arsenal. Belarus, Kazakhstan, and Ukraine inherited stockpiles of nuclear arms following the break-up of the Soviet Union, but relinquished them to the Russian Federation.

Countries where nuclear weapons are deployed through nuclear sharing agreements include Belgium, Germany, Italy, the Netherlands, and Turkey.

=== Biological weapons ===
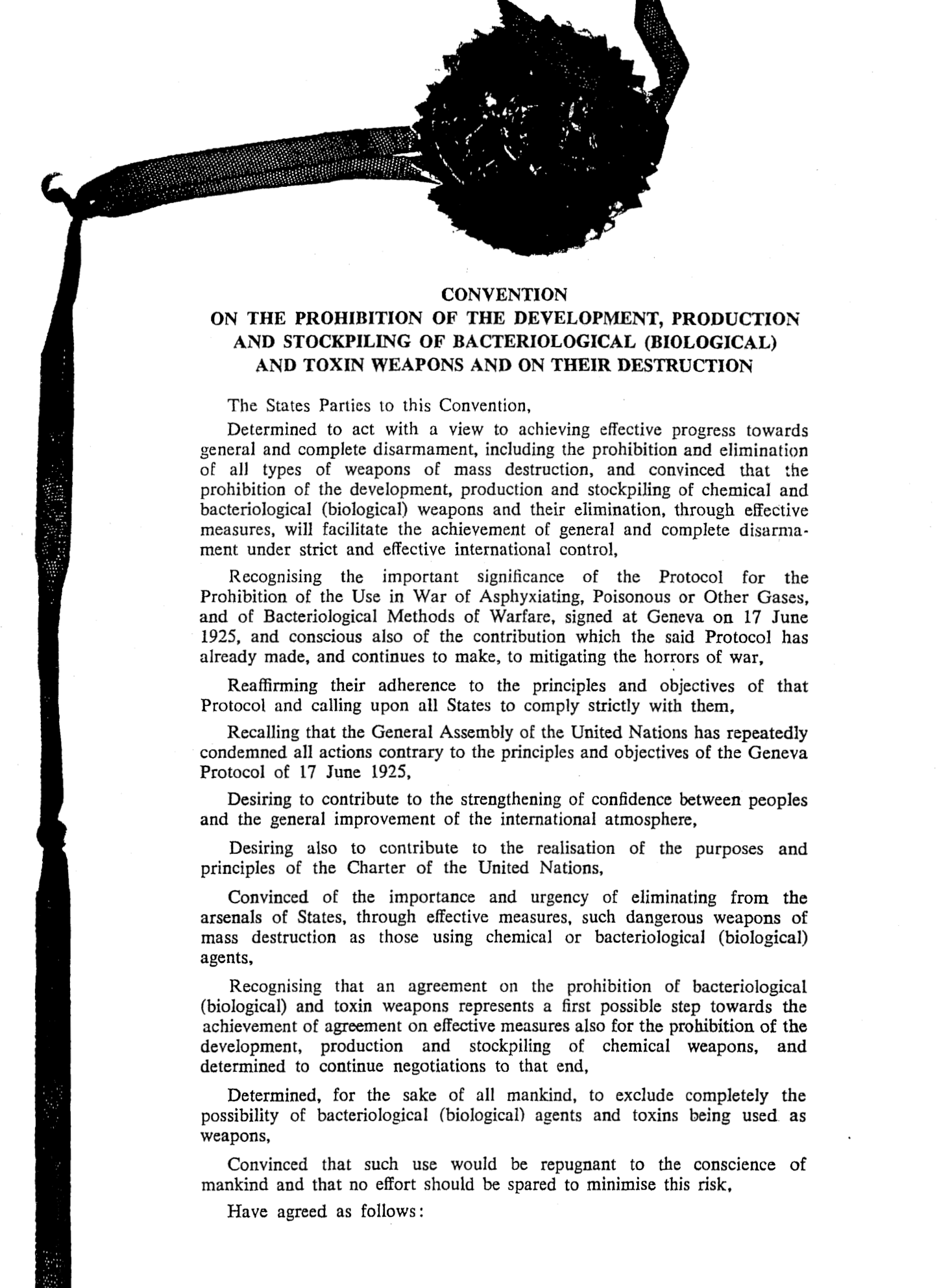
The Biological Weapons Convention

The history of biological warfare goes back at least to the Mongol siege of Caffa in 1346 and possibly much farther back to antiquity. It is believed that the Ancient Greeks contaminated their adversaries' wells by placing animal corpses in them. However, only by the turn of the 20th century did advances in microbiology allow for the large-scale weaponization of pathogens. During the First World War, German military attempted to introduce anthrax into Allied livestock. In the Second World War, Japan conducted aerial attacks on China using fleas carrying the bubonic plague. During the 20th century, at least nine states have operated offensive biological weapons programs, including Canada (1946–1956), France (1921–1972), Iraq (1985–1990s), Japan (1930s–1945), Rhodesia, South Africa (1981–1993), the Soviet Union (1920s–1992), the United Kingdom (1934–1956), and the United States (1943–1969). The Japanese biological weapons program, which was run by the secret Imperial Japanese Army Unit 731 during the Sino-Japanese War (1937–1945), became infamous for conducting often fatal human experiments on prisoners and producing biological weapons for combat use. The Soviet Union covertly operated the world's largest, longest, and most sophisticated biological weapons program, in violation of its obligations under international law.

International restrictions on biological warfare began with the 1925 Geneva Protocol, which prohibits the use but not the possession or development of biological and chemical weapons. Upon ratification of the Geneva Protocol, several countries made reservations regarding its applicability and use in retaliation. Due to these reservations, it was in practice a "no-first-use" agreement only. The 1972 Biological Weapons Convention (BWC) supplements the Geneva Protocol by prohibiting the development, production, acquisition, transfer, stockpiling, and use of biological weapons. Having entered into force on 26 March 1975, the BWC was the first multilateral disarmament treaty to ban the production of an entire category of weapons of mass destruction. As of March 2021, 183 states have become party to the treaty.

=== Chemical weapons ===
Chemical weapons have been used around the world by various civilizations since ancient times. The oldest reported case of a chemical substance being used as a weapon was in 256 AD during the siege of Dura-Europos. A mixture of tar and sulfur was used to produce sulfur oxides, which helped take control of the city. In the industrial era, chemical weapons were used extensively by both sides during World War I, and by the Axis powers during World War II (both in battle and in extermination camp gas chambers) though Allied powers also stockpiled them.

International restrictions on chemical warfare began with the Hague Conventions of 1899 and 1907, and was expanded significantly by the 1925 Geneva Protocol. These treaties prohibited the use of poisons or chemical agents in international warfare, but did not place restrictions on development or weapon stockpiles. Since 1997, the Chemical Weapons Convention (CWC) has expanded restrictions to prohibit any use and development of chemical weapons except for very limited purposes (research, medical, pharmaceutical or protective). As of 2018, a handful of countries have known inventories, and many are in the process of being safely destroyed. Nonetheless, proliferation and use in war zones remains an active concern, most recently the use of chemical weapons in the Syrian Civil War.

Countries with known or possible chemical weapons, as of 2021
Nation	CW Possession	Signed CWC	Ratified CWC
Albania	Eliminated, 2007	January 14, 1993	May 11, 1994
China	Probable	January 13, 1993	April 4, 1997
Egypt	Probable	No	No
India	Eliminated, 2009	January 14, 1993	September 3, 1996
Iran	Possible	January 13, 1993	November 3, 1997
Iraq	Eliminated, 2018	January 13, 2009	February 12, 2009
Israel	Probable	January 13, 1993	No
Japan	Probable	January 13, 1993	September 15, 1995
Libya	Eliminated, 2014	No	January 6, 2004 (acceded)
Myanmar (Burma)	Possible	January 14, 1993	July 8, 2015
North Korea	Known	No	No
Pakistan	Probable	January 13, 1993	November 27, 1997
Russia	Eliminated, 2017	January 13, 1993	November 5, 1997
Serbia and Montenegro	Probable	No	April 20, 2000 (acceded)
Sudan	Possible	No	May 24, 1999 (acceded)
Syria	Known	No	September 14, 2013 (acceded)
Taiwan	Possible	n/a	n/a
United States	Eliminated, 2023	January 13, 1993	April 25, 1997
Vietnam	Possible	January 13, 1993	September 30, 1998

== Ethics and international legal status ==
Some commentators classify some or all the uses of nuclear, chemical, or biological weapons during wartime as a war crime (or crime against humanity if widespread) because they kill civilians (who are protected by the laws of war) indiscriminately or are specifically prohibited by international treaties (which have become more comprehensive over time). Proponents of use say that specific uses of such weapons have been necessary for defense or to avoid more deaths in a protracted war. The tactic of terror bombing from aircraft, and generally targeting cities with area bombardment or saturation carpet bombing has also been criticized, defended, and prohibited by treaty in the same way; the destructive effect of conventional saturation bombing is similar to that of a nuclear weapon.

== United States politics ==
Due to the potentially indiscriminate effects of WMD, the fear of a WMD attack has shaped political policies and campaigns, fostered social movements, and has been the central theme of many films. Support for different levels of WMD development and control varies nationally and internationally. Yet understanding of the nature of the threats is not high, in part because of imprecise usage of the term by politicians and the media.

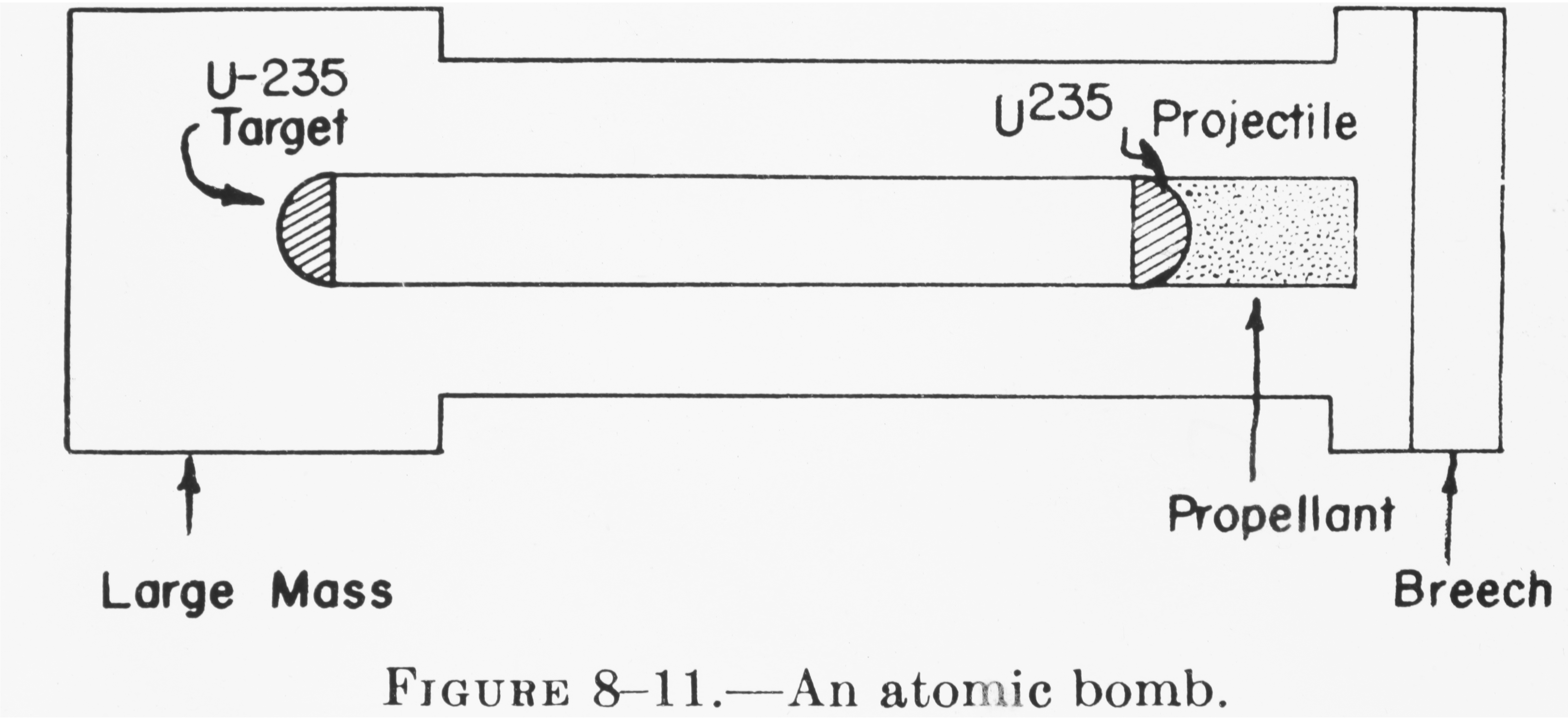
An atomic-bomb blueprint

Fear of WMD, or of threats diminished by the possession of WMD, has long been used to catalyze public support for various WMD policies. They include mobilization of pro- and anti-WMD campaigners alike, and generation of popular political support. The term WMD may be used as a powerful buzzword or to generate a culture of fear. It is also used ambiguously, particularly by not distinguishing among the different types of WMD.

A television commercial called Daisy, promoting Democrat Lyndon Johnson's 1964 presidential candidacy, invoked the fear of a nuclear war and was an element in Johnson's subsequent election.

Later, United States' President George W. Bush used the threat of potential WMD in Iraq as justification for the 2003 invasion of Iraq. Broad reference to Iraqi WMD in general was seen as an element of President Bush's arguments. The claim that Iraq possessed Weapons of Mass Destruction (WMD) was a major factor that led to the invasion of Iraq in 2003 by Coalition forces.

Over 500 munitions containing mustard agent and sarin were discovered throughout Iraq since 2003; they were made in the 1980s and are no longer usable as originally intended due to corrosion.

The American Heritage Dictionary defines a weapon of mass destruction as: "a weapon that can cause widespread destruction or kill large numbers of people, especially a nuclear, chemical, or biological weapon." In other words, it does not have to be nuclear, biological or chemical (NBC). For example, Dzhokhar Tsarnaev, one of the perpetrators of the Boston Marathon bombing, was charged under United States law 18 U.S.C. 2332A for using a weapon of mass destruction and that was a pressure cooker bomb. In other words, it was a weapon that caused large-scale death and destruction, without being an NBC weapon.

== Media coverage ==
In March 2004, the Center for International and Security Studies at Maryland (CISSM) released a report examining the media's coverage of WMD issues during three separate periods: nuclear weapons tests by India and Pakistan in May 1998; the U.S. announcement of evidence of a North Korean nuclear weapons program in October 2002; and revelations about Iran's nuclear program in May 2003. The CISSM report argues that poor coverage resulted less from political bias among the media than from tired journalistic conventions. The report's major findings were that:

1. Most media outlets represented WMD as a monolithic menace, failing to adequately distinguish between weapons programs and actual weapons or to address the real differences among chemical, biological, nuclear, and radiological weapons.

2. Most journalists accepted the Bush administration's formulation of the "War on Terror" as a campaign against WMD, in contrast to coverage during the Clinton era, when many journalists made careful distinctions between acts of terrorism and the acquisition and use of WMD.

3. Many stories stenographically reported the incumbent administration's perspective on WMD, giving too little critical examination of the way officials framed the events, issues, threats, and policy options.

4. Too few stories proffered alternative perspectives to official line, a problem exacerbated by the journalistic prioritizing of breaking-news stories and the "inverted pyramid" style of storytelling.

— Susan D. Moeller, Media Coverage of Weapons of Mass Destruction

In a separate study published in 2005, a group of researchers assessed the effects reports and retractions in the media had on people's memory regarding the search for WMD in Iraq during the 2003 Iraq War. The study focused on populations in two coalition countries (Australia and the United States) and one opposed to the war (Germany). Results showed that U.S. citizens generally did not correct initial misconceptions regarding WMD, even following disconfirmation; Australian and German citizens were more responsive to retractions. Dependence on the initial source of information led to a substantial minority of Americans exhibiting false memory that WMD were indeed discovered, while they were not. This led to three conclusions:

1. The repetition of tentative news stories, even if they are subsequently disconfirmed, can assist in the creation of false memories in a substantial proportion of people.
2. Once information is published, its subsequent correction does not alter people's beliefs unless they are suspicious about the motives underlying the events the news stories are about.
3. When people ignore corrections, they do so irrespective of how certain they are that the corrections occurred.

A poll conducted between June and September 2003 asked people whether they thought evidence of WMD had been discovered in Iraq since the war ended. They were also asked which media sources they relied upon. Those who obtained their news primarily from Fox News were three times as likely to believe that evidence of WMD had been discovered in Iraq than those who relied on PBS and NPR for their news, and one third more likely than those who primarily watched CBS.

Media source	Respondents believing evidence of WMD had been found in Iraq
Fox	33%
CBS	23%
NBC	20%
CNN	20%
ABC	19%
Print media	17%
PBS–NPR	11%

Based on a series of polls taken from June–September 2003.

In 2006, Fox News reported the claims of two Republican lawmakers that WMDs had been found in Iraq, based upon unclassified portions of a report by the National Ground Intelligence Center. Quoting from the report, Senator Rick Santorum said "Since 2003, coalition forces have recovered approximately 500 weapons munitions which contain degraded mustard or sarin nerve agent". According to David Kay, who appeared before the U.S. House Armed Services Committee to discuss these badly corroded munitions, they were leftovers, many years old, improperly stored or destroyed by the Iraqis. Charles Duelfer agreed, stating on NPR's Talk of the Nation: "When I was running the ISG – the Iraq Survey Group – we had a couple of them that had been turned in to these IEDs, the improvised explosive devices. But they are local hazards. They are not a major, you know, weapon of mass destruction."

Later, wikileaks would show that WMDs of these kinds continued to be found as the Iraqi occupation continued.

Many news agencies, including Fox News, reported the conclusions of the CIA that, based upon the investigation of the Iraq Survey Group, WMDs are yet to be found in Iraq.

== Public perceptions ==
Awareness and opinions of WMD have varied during the course of their history. Their threat is a source of unease, security, and pride to different people. The anti-WMD movement is embodied most in nuclear disarmament, and led to the formation of the British Campaign for Nuclear Disarmament in 1957.

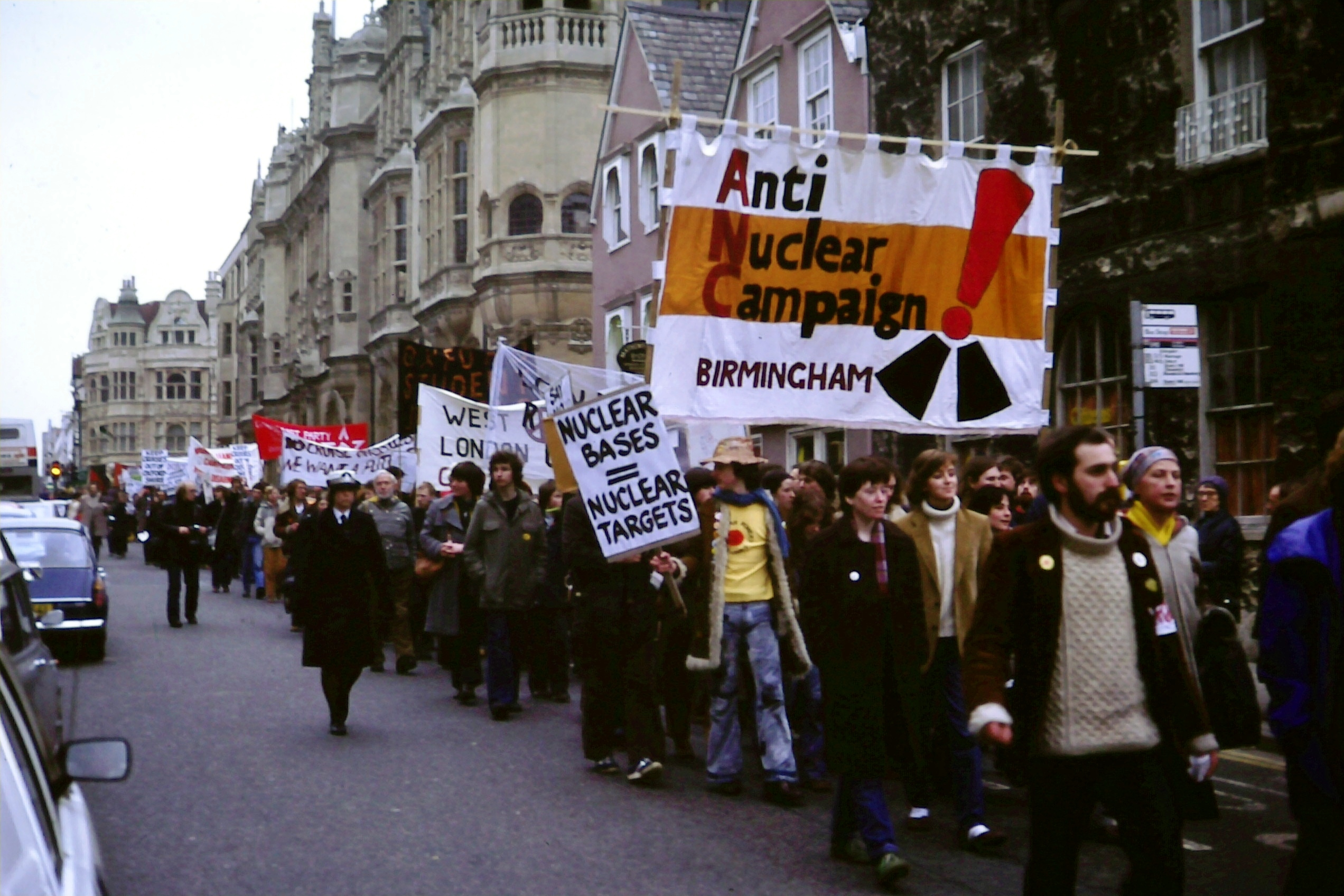
Anti-nuclear weapons protest march in Oxford, 1980

In order to increase awareness of all kinds of WMD, in 2004 the nuclear physicist and Nobel Peace Prize winner Joseph Rotblat inspired the creation of The WMD Awareness Programme to provide trustworthy and up to date information on WMD worldwide.

In 1998, the University of New Mexico's Institute for Public Policy released their third report on U.S. perceptions – including the general public, politicians and scientists – of nuclear weapons since the breakup of the Soviet Union. Risks of nuclear conflict, proliferation, and terrorism were seen as substantial.

While maintenance of the U.S. nuclear arsenal was considered above average in importance, there was widespread support for a reduction in the stockpile, and very little support for developing and testing new nuclear weapons.

Also in 1998, nuclear weapons became an issue in India's election of March, in relation to political tensions with neighboring Pakistan. Prior to the election the Bharatiya Janata Party (BJP) announced it would "declare India a nuclear weapon state" after coming to power.

BJP won the elections, and on 14 May, three days after India tested nuclear weapons for the second time, a public opinion poll reported that a majority of Indians favored the country's nuclear build-up.

On 15 April 2004, the Program on International Policy Attitudes (PIPA) reported that U.S. citizens showed high levels of concern regarding WMD, and that preventing the spread of nuclear weapons should be "a very important U.S. foreign policy goal", accomplished through multilateral arms control rather than the use of military threats.

A majority also believed the United States should be more forthcoming with its biological research and its Nuclear Non-Proliferation Treaty commitment of nuclear arms reduction.

A Russian opinion poll conducted on 5 August 2005 indicated half the population believed new nuclear powers have the right to possess nuclear weapons. 39% believed the Russian stockpile should be reduced, though not eliminated.

== In popular culture ==
Weapons of mass destruction and their related impacts have been a mainstay of popular culture since the beginning of the Cold War, as both political commentary and humorous outlet. The actual phrase "weapons of mass destruction" has been used similarly and as a way to characterise any powerful force or product since the Iraqi weapons crisis in the lead up to the Coalition invasion of Iraq in 2003. Science-fiction may introduce novel weapons of mass destruction with much greater yields or impact than anything in reality.

The term; “Weapon of Mass Destruction”, verbatim, is voiced in the American dubbed 1964 anime television show Gigantor. Season 1, episode 3 (Japan, 1963)

== Common hazard symbols ==
Symbol Type (Toxic, Radioactive or Biohazard)	Symbol	Unicode	Image
Toxic symbol	☠	U+2620	Skull and crossbones
Radioactive symbol	☢	U+2622	Radioactivity
Biohazard symbol	☣	U+2623	Biohazard

=== Radioactive weaponry or hazard symbol ===
Radioactivity

2007 ISO radioactivity danger symbol

The international radioactivity symbol (also known as trefoil) first appeared in 1946, at the University of California, Berkeley Radiation Laboratory. At the time, it was rendered as magenta, and was set on a blue background.

It is drawn with a central circle of radius R, the blades having an internal radius of 1.5R and an external radius of 5R, and separated from each other by 60°. It is meant to represent a radiating atom.

The International Atomic Energy Agency found that the trefoil radiation symbol is unintuitive and can be variously interpreted by those uneducated in its meaning; therefore, its role as a hazard warning was compromised as it did not clearly indicate "danger" to many non-Westerners and children who encountered it. As a result of research, a new radiation hazard symbol (ISO 21482) was developed in 2007 to be placed near the most dangerous parts of radiation sources featuring a skull, someone running away, and using a red rather than yellow background.

The red background is intended to convey urgent danger, and the sign is intended to be used on equipment where very strong ionizing radiation can be encountered if the device is dismantled or otherwise tampered with. The intended use of the sign is not in a place where the normal user will see it, but in a place where it will be seen by someone who has started to dismantle a radiation-emitting device or equipment. The aim of the sign is to warn people such as scrap metal workers to stop work and leave the area.

=== Biological weaponry or hazard symbol ===
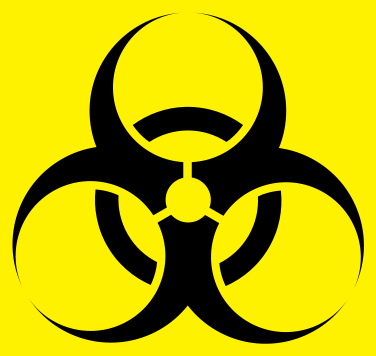
Biohazard

Developed by Dow Chemical company in the 1960s for their containment products.

According to Charles Dullin, an environmental-health engineer who contributed to its development:

"We wanted something that was memorable but meaningless, so we could educate people as to what it means."

== See also ==
- The Bomb (film) – 2015 American documentary film
- CBRN defense
- Commission on the Prevention of WMD proliferation and terrorism
- List of CBRN warfare forces
- Core (game theory)
- Ethnic bioweapon
- Fallout shelter
- Game theory
- Global Partnership Against the Spread of Weapons and Materials of Mass Destruction
- Commission on the Intelligence Capabilities of the United States Regarding Weapons of Mass Destruction
- Kinetic bombardment
- List of global issues
- Mutual assured destruction
- NBC suit
- New physical principles weapons
- Nuclear terrorism
- Operations Plus WMD
- Orbital bombardment
- Russia and weapons of mass destruction
- Strategic bombing
- United States and weapons of mass destruction
- Weapons of Mass Destruction Commission
