= Wiser =

Wiser may refer to:

- Wireless Information System for Emergency Responders, known as WISER
- Wiser (album), by Halou
- Women's Institute for Secondary Education and Research (WISER), a non-profit NGO in Muhuru Bay, Kenya
- Women's Institute for Science, Equity and Race (WISER), a nonprofit policy research institute
- Wiser's, a Canadian whisky brand
