= Midwest Consortium for Hazardous Waste Worker Training =

The Midwest Consortium for Hazardous Waste Worker Training provides training to workers who may be exposed to hazardous materials while performing jobs covered by the Occupational Safety and Health Administration’s (OSHA) Hazardous Waste Operations and Emergency Response (HAZWOPER) standard, and to help employers comply with OSHA standard 29 CFR 1910.120.

The consortium has been funded since 1987 by the National Institute for Environmental Health Sciences (NIEHS) to develop, present and evaluate model worker training programs in nine Midwestern states (Illinois, Indiana, Kentucky, Michigan, Minnesota, Ohio, Tennessee, Wisconsin, and North Dakota). Professor Carol Rice, Ph.D., CIH (http://www.eh.uc.edu/dir_individual_details.asp?qcontactid=85), at the University of Cincinnati (http://www.uc.edu), is the Principal Investigator.

The consortium's specific aims are to serve the needs of the region through interactive, hands-on training developed to meet the needs of adult learners employed in jobs covered by HAZWOPER; to document the change in and retention of knowledge and skills as a result of training; to evaluate the impact of training and residents after return to the workplace; to provide training in communities where hazardous materials exposures may occur; and to fully integrate advanced training technologies into program content and delivery.

== Training centers ==
- Citizens for Environmental Justice
- Detroiters Working for Environmental Justice
- Environmental Management Institute (http://www.EnvMgt.org/pricetab.htm)
- Fisk University - Environmental Justice Program (http://www.fisk.edu/)
- Greater Cincinnati Occupational Health Center
- Lakeshore Technical College (http://www.gotoltc.com/em/index.php)
- Michigan State University
- Ohio Environmental Council (http://www.theoec.org/)
- The Three Affiliated Tribes
- University of Illinois (http://www.illinoishazmat.org)
- University of Kentucky (http://www.uky.edu/)
- Kentucky Community and Technical College System
- University of Minnesota
- University of Tennessee
