= Operations Plus WMD =

Operations Plus WMD is a training level in dealing with hazardous materials in the US.

== Applicability in the US ==
So the Operation OSHA minimum Level 2 Operations standard could be applicable more so if not a National Incident, yet case specific. Furthermore, in the bigger picture other federal agencies are involved and OSHA follows those procedures so typically responders would have training at this Operations Plus WMD from a viable training facility that has instructors trained through a U.S. Department of Homeland Security Grant and other education and experience or shall have needed critical training that would keep them from being in danger. In the bigger picture these responders obtain any resource necessary to respond save lives or mitigate a WMD incident safely. Whatever the cause is examples of such resources can be found on government websites or private sector. In the private sector instructors who specialize in Operation's Plus WMD can assist in public or secret contracts. Scientists help develop Operations Plus WMD training and remediation programs for WMD that will play a critical role in training public sector environmental workers or Emergency Response Teams (ERT).

== Training ==
This training is broken in segments for triage, chemical, crime scene, risk management, explosives, biological, and radiological and used widely by hospitals in major populated areas for training emergency response teams managers or instructors that go beyond the Operations levels in NIMMS National Incident Management Systems. In part because of facilities, situational and those who seek more knowledge. The future of WMD holds many uncertainties. Operations Plus WMD would be needed for current homeland security. It might be needed in current war's aftermath with other training such as Unexploded Ordnance Specialist (UXO) like remediation of depleted uranium or aftermath of future wars. Operations Plus WMD responders work with specialist in incident command, safety, response managers, and other officials who make decisions in an incident.

== Based on NFPA 472 ==
Much of the current information is based on a National Fire Protection Agency (NFPA) standard 472:

1) NFPA 472 The formal name for NFPA 472 is the “Standard for Competence of Responders to Hazardous Materials/Weapons of Mass Destruction Incidents, 2008 Edition.” It represents the consensus standard for hazmat competency requirements and serves as the reference for minimum firefighter hazmat training.

2) Some changes with NFPA 472. Under the 2008 Edition of NFPA 472, key Operations Level Hazardous Materials/Weapons of Mass Destruction (HM/WMD) tasks have been more clearly defined and labeled as "Mission-Specific Competencies": The use of PPE; Air Monitoring and Sampling; Victim Rescue/Recovery; Product Control; Evidence Preservation/Sampling; Performing Mass Decontamination; Performing Technical Decontamination, and Response to Illicit Laboratory Incidents. 3) What are "Mission Specific Competencies"? This term refers to competencies where the Authority Having Jurisdiction (AHJ) can match the expected tasks and duties of its personnel with the competencies required to perform those tasks. These competencies should be performed under the guidance of a Hazardous Materials Technician (HMT), allied professional, or Standard Operating Procedure (SOP). A more detailed description of specific tasks can be found in NFPA 472, Chapter 6.

However, the other basis of such information are also in FEMA publications Guidelines for Haz Mat / WMD Response, Planning and Prevention Training, To the point the original efforts came about from efforts of The Resources Conservation and Recovery Act of 1976 (RCRA), and passage of Superfund then amended in 11986 Superfund Amendments and reauthorization Act (SARA) Title I, Section 126(a)(b)(c), was enacted to require the Occupational Safety and Health Administration (OSHA) to develop standards for safety and health. Thus emerged HAZWOPER as the US Government was faced with clean-up sites from a variety of sources its own (including nuclear waste) and private sector. Therefore, Hazardous Waste Operations and Emergency Response (HAZWOPER) 29 CFR 1910.120 (1989) The guidelines from NFPA 472 as designed exceed the OSHA standard developed it to define the competencies for personnel responding to hazardous materials emergencies.

Within Guidelines for Haz Mat / WMD Response, Planning and Prevention Training it breaks down a two track approach to public sector training: 1) Required by OSHA 29 CFR 1910.120(q) describes minimum training requirements. 2) recommended training, objectives' that reflects the training organization described in NFPA 472 and 473 standards and other training recommendations that incorporated or developed by the national author team.

Chicago Safety institute takes a comprehensive approach offering a program that includes Operations Plus WMD, radiation screening, air monitoring with a three tier approach that manager or workers can utilize to mitigate the situation and help be better enabled to protect their co-workers.

1) OSHA compliance 29 CFR 1910.120

2) Emergency Response utilizing available NFPA 472 and 473 or training customized with any necessary additions at an Operational Level for workers and managers to gain the needed skill sets.

3) That include a comprehensive Operations Plus for WMD, emergency response, and environmental clean-up training; for workers, manager, specialists or Site Safety Supervisors for contractors engaged in such aftermath of these emergencies with the potential for an emergency to reoccur and/or existing environmental clean-ups. Although time is not the entire criteria of training that is mostly performance based, it easily could take over 120 hours to bring a manager up to speed provided they had experience and education.

The average worker engaged in a WMD clean-up would still have to have 40 hours of training. Regularly engaged clean-up workers usually would include the practice using Level A or Level B protection Personal Protective Equipment (PPE) NFPA 1991 PPE and the employer work place assessment of hazards usually by an Environmental Health and Safety Specialist and their site specific training for safety based on those tasks and outcomes. However a WMD incident could require NFPA 1994 or CBRN approved gear. For example, a site with radioactive material and Beryllium would have to have a detailed task analysis to prevent exposure, UXO could have a chemical warhead, or a Clandestine Laboratory or a warhead may have released after an explosion it could have potential for an emergency to reoccur such that a blister or nerve agent may be present.

Operation Plus WMD plays an important role in controlling the incident and forms the basis of what some Incident commanders might need to know and comprehensive guide for managers of former military clean-up site or others where WMD is found in an unwanted place.
