= Wireless Information System for Emergency Responders =

Wireless Information System for Emergency Responders (WISER) is a system to assist first responders in identification of hazardous materials during a response. The system was created by the United States National Library of Medicine. The system was discontinued in 2023.

== Capabilities ==
WISER has the most likely encountered entries from the Hazardous Substance Data Bank. It simplifies the data with an interface to easily help identify unknown substances. Known substances can be searched for through a variety of different means including: UN number, CAS number, and Science Transportation Commodity Code (STCC) number. The system provides health effects, an overview of treatments and occupational exposure levels. Additional tools are available including the Emergency Response Guidebook and a Weapon of Mass Destruction Guidebook.

== Platforms ==
WISER has a downloadable application on Microsoft Windows PCs, Windows Mobile devices and Palm OS PDAs. It is also a browser-based application (WebWISER) for both PDA and PC based browsers.
