= HAZWOPER =

Hazardous Waste Operations and Emergency Response (HAZWOPER; /ˈhæzwɒpər/ HAZ-waw-pər) is a set of guidelines produced by a collaboration between National Institute of Occupational Safety and Health, Occupational Safety and Health Administration, United States Coast Guard, and Environmental Protection Agency and more which regulates hazardous waste operations and emergency services in the United States and its territories. These regulations are recognized and implement throughout many government departments and need their cooperation to work effectively. With these guidelines, the U.S. government regulates hazardous wastes and dangerous goods from inception to disposal.

HAZWOPER applies to five groups of employers and their employees. This includes employees who are exposed (or potentially exposed) to hazardous substances (including hazardous waste) and who are engaged in one of the following operations as specified by OSHA regulations 1910.120(a)(1)(i-v) and 1926.65(a)(1)(i-v):

- Cleanup operations required by a governmental body (federal, state, local or other) involving hazardous substances conducted at uncontrolled hazardous-waste sites
- Corrective actions involving clean-up operations at sites covered by the Resource Conservation and Recovery Act of 1976 (RCRA) as amended (42 U.S.C. 6901 et seq.)
- Voluntary cleanup operations at sites recognized by a federal, state, local, or other governmental body as uncontrolled hazardous-waste sites
- Operations involving hazardous waste which are conducted at treatment, storage and disposal facilities regulated by Title 40 of the Code of Federal Regulations, parts 264 and 265 pursuant to the RCRA, or by agencies under agreement with the U.S. Environmental Protection Agency to implement RCRA regulations
- Emergency response operations for releases of, or substantial threats of release of, hazardous substances (regardless of the hazard's location)

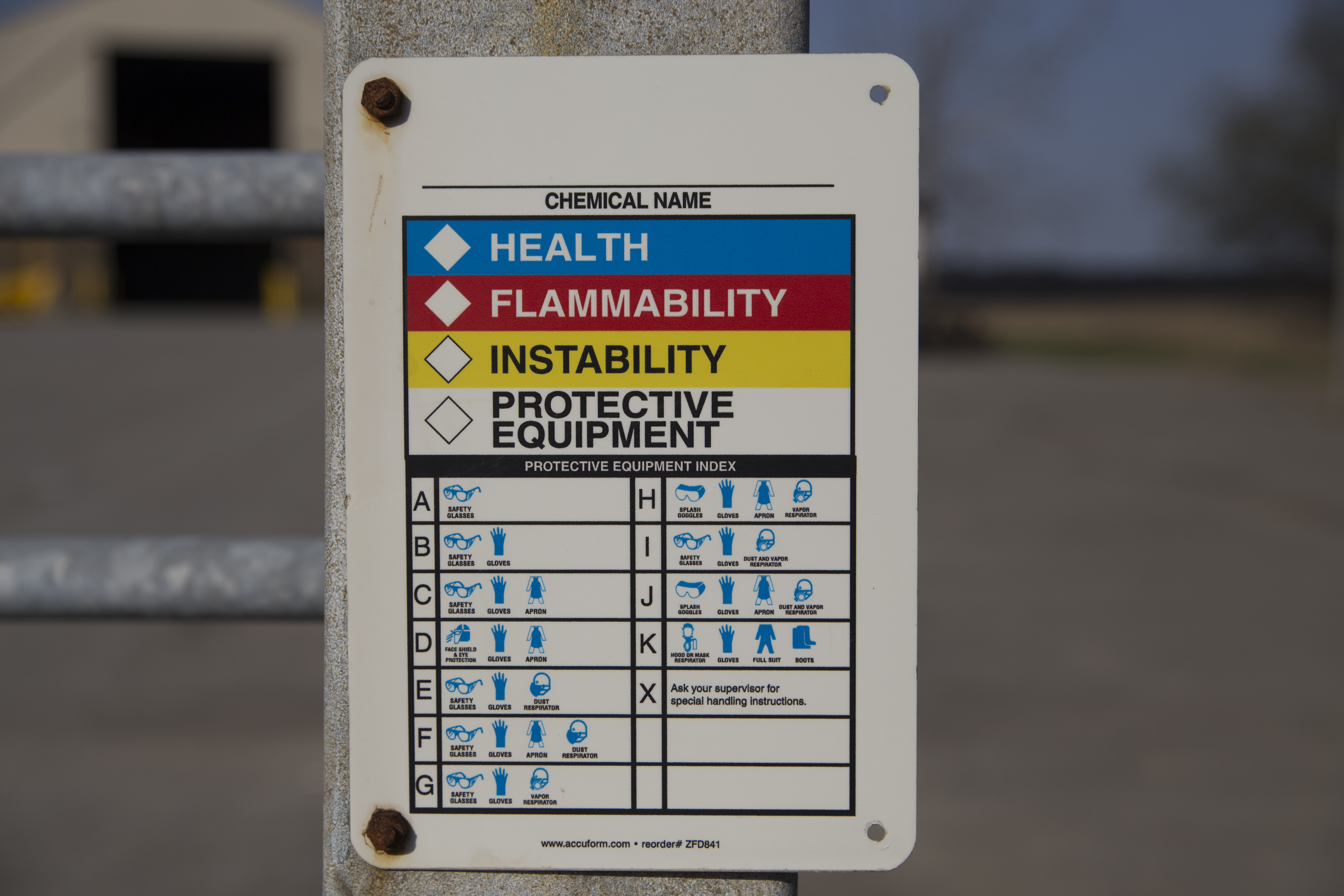
DOT Identification Card

The most commonly used manual for HAZWOPER activities is Department of Health and Human Services Publication 85–115, Occupational Safety and Health Guidance Manual for Hazardous Waste Site Activities. Written for government contractors and first responders, the manual lists safety requirements for cleanups and emergency-response operations. Sources that should be used when determining the regulation of HAZWOPER are the Emergency Response Guidebook This is a book that shows how hazardous materials should be labelled and what each visual indicator means, this can assist emergency responders when trying to figure out the cause of the fire or what kind of material they are dealing with. This guidebook is through the Department of Transportation (DOT) so it is catered towards transporting and storing materials. It is very important that these rules and regulation to be put into place because these hazardous materials can cause chronic and acute problems such as irritation, sanitation, and other toxic illnesses that could be fatal. Incorrect disposal of hazardous waste can also have bigger effects such as fires, explosions, or other emergency events.

== History ==
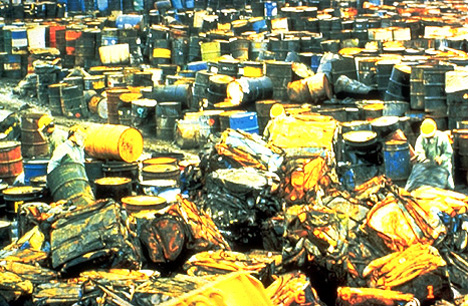
Picture of Valley of Drums

Although it is a multi-agency collaboration, HAZWOPER describes OSHA-required regulatory training. Its relevance dates to World War II, when waste accumulated during construction of the atomic bomb at the Hanford Site. Years later, high-profile environmental mishaps (such as Love Canal in 1978 and the attempted 1979 Valley of the Drums cleanup) spurred federal legislative action, awakening the U.S. to the need to control and contain hazardous waste. Two programs—CERCLA, the Comprehensive Environmental Response, Compensation, and Liability Act and the Resource Conservation and Recovery Act (RCRA) of 1976—were implemented to deal with these wastes. CERCLA (the Superfund) was designed to deal with existing waste sites, and RCRA addressed newly generated waste. The acronym HAZWOPER originally derived from the Department of Defense's Hazardous Waste Operations (HAZWOP), implemented on military bases slated for the disposal of hazardous waste left on-site after World War II. In 1989 production ended at the Hanford Site, and work shifted to the cleanup of portions of the site contaminated with hazardous substances including radionuclides and chemical waste. These agencies used their knowledge together to create a manual on how to handle hazardous waste. These regulations are published through a joint effort between the federal agencies and are enforced in the states by each agency. In 1984, the combined-agency effort resulted in the Hazardous Waste Operations and Emergency Response Guidance Manual. On March 6, 1990, OSHA published Hazardous Waste Operations and Emergency Response 1910.120, the HAZWOPER standard codifying the health-and-safety requirements companies must meet to perform hazardous-waste cleanup or respond to emergencies. There are similar versions of these regulations throughout the federal agencies, the EPA and OSHA versions are the most followed. The EPA version is more focused on the environment and protecting nature, while OSHA focuses more on workers and how they should handle waste cleanup. There are more versions such as the Department of Transportation and Federal Emergency Management Association that implement the rules of hazardous waste cleanup and regulations.

== Scope ==
Hazardous waste, as defined by the standard, is a waste (or combination of wastes) according to 40 CFR §261.3 or substances defined as hazardous wastes in 49 CFR §171.8. Hazardous waste is characterized if the substance is ignitable, toxic, corrosive, reactive, or toxic. There are four different categories of hazardous waste, they are listed as groups F, K, P, and U. F group wastes are common industries that do not fit into a specific category, and K group wastes include industries from a specific list. P and U materials are composed of pure hazards and commercial grade formulas. It is important to make sure that these categories and groups are labelled correctly and workers have proper training on storing hazardous waste as incorrectly moving and places hazardous chemicals together may cause a fire hazard or another explosion hazard. The EPA made sure to check all the types of chemicals and waste and compiled this classification system under The Resource Conservation and Recovery Act (RCRA) which was a bill passed in 1976.

== Training levels ==
OSHA recognizes several levels of training, based on the work the employee performs and the degree of hazard faced. Each level requires a training program, with OSHA-specified topics and minimum training time.

- General site workers initially require 40 hours of instruction, three days of supervised hands-on training and eight hours refresher training annually.
- Workers limited to a specific task, or workers on fully characterized sites with no hazards above acceptable levels, require HAZWOPER 24-Hour initial training, one day of supervised hands-on training and eight hours of refresher training annually.
- Managers and supervisors require the same level of training as those they supervise, plus eight hours.
- Workers at a treatment, storage or disposal facility handling RCRA waste require 24 hours of initial training, best practice two days of supervised hands-on training and eight hours of refresher training annually. 1910.120(p)(8)(iii)(B) Employee members of TSD facility emergency response organizations shall be trained to a level of competence in the recognition of health and safety hazards to protect themselves and other employees. This would include training in the methods used to minimize the risk from safety and health hazards; in the safe use of control equipment; in the selection and use of appropriate personal protective equipment; in the safe operating procedures to be used at the incident scene; in the techniques of coordination with other employees to minimize risks; in the appropriate response to over exposure from health hazards or injury to themselves and other employees; and in the recognition of subsequent symptoms which may result from over exposures.
- The First Responder Awareness Level requires sufficient training to demonstrate competence in assigned duties.
- The First Responder Operations Level requires Awareness-Level training plus eight hours.
- Hazardous Materials Technicians require 24 hours training plus additional training to achieve competence in specialized areas.
- Hazardous Materials Specialist requires 24 hours training at the Technician level, plus additional specialized training.
- On-scene Incident Commander requires 24 hours training plus additional training to achieve competence in designated areas.

In some instances, training levels overlap; other levels are not authorized by OSHA because their training is not sufficiently specific. A site safety supervisor (or officer) and a competent industrial hygienist or other technically qualified, HAZWOPER-trained person should be consulted.

== Training and certification sources ==
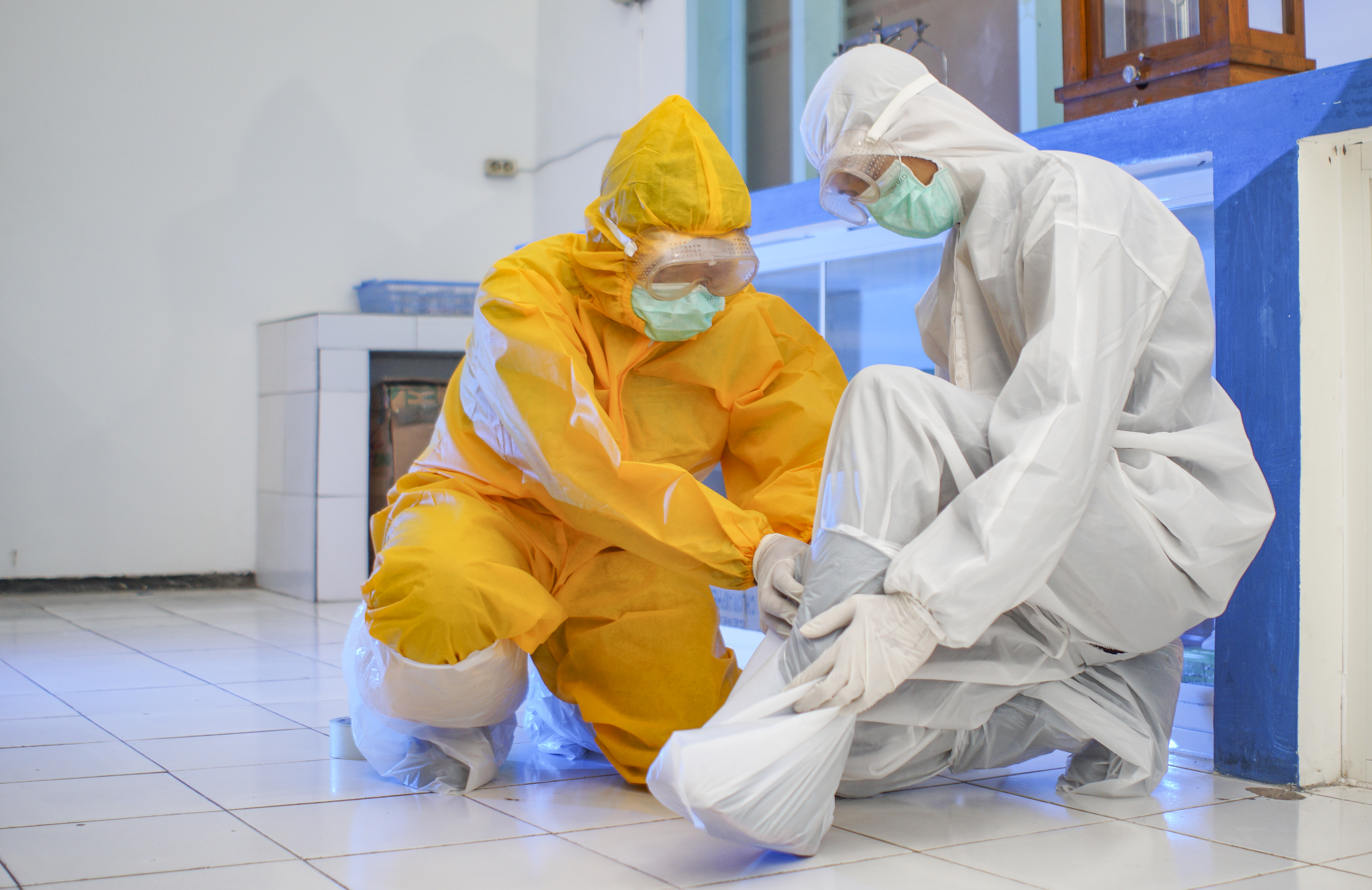
PPE used for diseases

An employer must ensure that the training provider covers the areas of knowledge required by the standard and provides certification to students that they have passed the training. Since the certification is for the student, not the employer, the trainer must cover all aspects of HAZWOPER operations and not only those at the current site. OSHA training requires cleanup workers to focus on personal protective equipment separately from emergency-response equipment. There are 4 levels of PPE that range from A-D that HAZWOPER training will cover that vary in skin, respiratory and eye protection. NIOSH created a handbook that explains the types of respiratory equipment that should be used in a hazardous material situation. This guidebook is named Chemical, Biological, Radiological, and Nuclear (CBRN) Respiratory Protection Handbook, this book tells the reader about how to maintain their respirators, training for the equipment, and how to dispose of the respirators. NIOSH and OSHA also created a pyramid matrix on what types of protection is needed for each level of waste management. There are three different levels that correlate with different levels of coverage. Each layer of the pyramid correlates with the likeliness of CBRN contamination is known, according to those exposures is what OSHA and NIOSH decide what kind of equipment is needed.

== See also ==
- Dangerous goods
- Firefighter
