= List of parties to the Hague Conventions of 1899 and 1907 =

Parties of the Permanent Court of Arbitration Convention of 1907 Convention of 1899 Not a party

The following tables shows the different states that are currently a party to the various Hague Conventions of 1899 and 1907 or were. If a state has ratified, acceded, or succeeded to one of the treaties, the year is indicated, not the entry into force date. An "S" indicates that a state has signed but not yet ratified a particular treaty, and a "–" indicates that the state has taken no action with respect to the treaty. Dates that have a "(W)" beside them are ratifications that have been subsequently withdrawn.

== 1899 Hague Conventions and Declarations ==
State (Note: Unless otherwise specified, this is the current state for which the treaty is in force. If the ratifying state is different than the current state, this is noted in a footnote. Dates that have a "(W)" beside them are ratifications that have been subsequently withdrawn.)	(I) dd.mm.yyyy	(II) dd.mm.yyyy	(III) dd.mm.yyyy	(IV,1) dd.mm.yyyy	(IV,2) dd.mm.yyyy	(IV,3) dd.mm.yyyy
Argentina	15.06.1907	17.06.1907	17.06.1907	–	–	–
Armenia	23.04.2025	−	−	−	−	−
Australia	01.04.1960	–	–	–	–	–
Austria-Hungary (Note: Ceased to be a state on 11 November 1918.)	04.09.1900	04.09.1900	04.09.1900	04.09.1900	04.09.1900	04.09.1900
Austria	12.11.1918	12.11.1918	12.11.1918	–	12.11.1918	12.11.1918
Belarus (Note: Ratified as the Byelorussian SSR.)	04.06.1962	04.06.1962	04.06.1962	–	04.06.1962	04.06.1962
Belgium	04.09.1900	04.09.1900	04.09.1900	04.09.1900	04.09.1900	04.09.1900
Bolivia	15.06.1907	07.02.1907	07.02.1907	–	–	–
Brazil	15.06.1907	25.02.1907	25.02.1907	–	–	–
Bulgaria (Note: Ratified as the Principality of Bulgaria.)	04.09.1900	04.09.1900	04.09.1900	04.09.1900	04.09.1900	04.09.1900
Burkina Faso	30.08.1961	–	–	–	–	–
Cambodia	07.01.1956	–	–	–	–	–
Cameroon	01.08.1961	–	–	–	–	–
Canada	19.08.1960	–	–	–	–	–
Chile	15.06.1907	19.06.1907	19.06.1907	–	–	–
China (Note: During the Qing Dynasty.)	21.11.1904	12.06.1907	21.11.1904	21.11.1904	21.11.1904	21.11.1904
Colombia	15.06.1907	30.01.1907	30.01.1907	–	–	–
Croatia	07.10.1998	–	–	–	–	–
Cuba	15.06.1907	17.04.1907	29.06.1907	–	–	–
Democratic Republic of the Congo	25.03.1961	–	–	–	–	–
Denmark (Note: Representing the Danish Realm.)	04.09.1900	04.09.1900	04.09.1900	04.09.1900	04.09.1900	04.09.1900
Dominican Republic	15.06.1907	13.04.1907	29.06.1907	–	–	–
Ecuador	03.07.1907	31.07.1907	05.08.1907	–	–	–
El Salvador	20.06.1907	20.06.1902	20.06.1902	–	–	–
Ethiopia	30.07.2003	–	–	–	09.08.1935 (Note: Ratified as "Abyssinia" by the Ethiopian Empire.)	09.08.1935
Fiji	02.04.1973	02.04.1973	02.04.1973	–	02.04.1973	02.04.1973
France (Note: Ratified as the government of the French Third Republic.)	04.09.1900	04.09.1900	04.09.1900	04.09.1900	04.09.1900	04.09.1900
Germany (Note: Ratified as the German Empire.)	04.09.1900	04.09.1900	04.09.1900	04.09.1900	04.09.1900	04.09.1900
Greece (Note: Ratified as the Kingdom of Greece.)	04.04.1901	04.04.1901	04.04.1901	04.04.1901	04.04.1901	04.04.1901
Guatemala	15.06.1907	02.05.1906	06.04.1903	–	–	–
Haiti	15.06.1907	24.05.1907	29.06.1907	–	–	–
Honduras	01.12.1961	21.08.1906	21.08.1906	–	–	–
Hungary	16.11.1918	16.11.1918	16.11.1918	–	16.11.1918	16.11.1918
Iceland	08.12.1955	−	−	−	−	−
India	29.07.1950	29.07.1950	29.07.1950	–	29.07.1950	29.07.1950
Iran (Note: Ratified as "Persia" by the Qajar dynasty government.)	04.09.1900	04.09.1900	04.09.1900	04.09.1900	04.09.1900	04.09.1900
Iraq	31.08.1970	–	–	–	–	–
Italy (Note: Ratified as the Kingdom of Italy.)	04.09.1900	04.09.1900	04.09.1900	04.09.1900	04.09.1900	04.09.1900
Japan (Note: Ratified as the Empire of Japan.)	06.10.1900	06.10.1900	06.10.1900	06.10.1900	06.10.1900	06.10.1900
South Korea (Note: Ratified as the Korean Empire.)	–	17.03.1903	07.02.1903	–	–	–
Kyrgyzstan	04.06.1992	–	–	–	–	–
Laos	18.07.1955	18.07.1955	–	–	–	–
Lebanon	14.02.1968	–	–	–	–	–
Luxembourg	12.07.1901	12.07.1901	12.07.1901	12.07.1901	12.07.1901	12.07.1901
Republic of Macedonia	19.12.2000	–	–	–	–	–
Mauritius	03.08.1970	–	–	–	–	–
Mexico (Note: During the Porfiriato.)	17.04.1901	17.04.1901	17.04.1901	17.04.1901	17.04.1901	17.04.1901
Principality of Montenegro (Note: Ceased to be a state on 28 November 1918.)	16.10.1900	16.10.1900	16.10.1900	16.10.1900	16.10.1900	16.10.1900
Montenegro	01.03.2007	01.03.2007	01.03.2007	–	01.03.2007	01.03.2007
Netherlands	04.09.1900	04.09.1900	04.09.1900	04.09.1900	04.09.1900	04.09.1900
New Zealand	10.02.1959	–	–	–	–	–
Nicaragua	15.06.1907	17.05.1907	17.05.1907	–	11.10.1907	11.10.1907
Norway	17.06.1905	05.07.1907	17.06.1905	17.06.1905	17.06.1905	17.06.1905
Pakistan	05.08.1950	05.08.1950	05.08.1950	–	05.08.1950	05.08.1950
Panama	15.06.1907	20.07.1907	22.07.1907	–	–	–
Paraguay	15.06.1907	12.04.1907	29.06.1907	–	–	–
Peru	15.06.1907	24.11.1903	24.11.1903	–	–	–
Portugal (Note: Ratified as the Kingdom of Portugal.)	04.09.1900	04.09.1900	04.09.1900	04.09.1900	04.09.1900	29.08.1907
Romania (Note: Ratified as the Kingdom of Romania.)	04.09.1900	04.09.1900	04.09.1900	04.09.1900	04.09.1900	04.09.1900
Russia (Note: Ratified as the Russian Empire. Ratifications were recognized by the Soviet Union "to the extent that the said Conventions and Declarations do not conflict with the Charter of the United Nations and provided that they have not been amended or superseded by subsequent international agreements to which the USSR is a party, such as the 1925 Geneva Protocol for the Prohibition of the Use in War of Asphyxiating, Poisonous or Other Similar Gases and of Bacteriological Means and the 1949 Geneva Conventions for the Protection of Victims of War.")	04.09.1900	04.09.1900	04.09.1900	04.09.1900	04.09.1900	04.09.1900
Senegal	01.08.1977	–	–	–	–	–
Serbia (Note: Ratified as the Federal Republic of Yugoslavia.)	07.09.2001	07.09.2001	07.09.2001	–	07.09.2001	07.09.2001
Slovenia	01.10.1996	–	–	–	–	–
South Africa	–	10.03.1978	10.03.1978	–	10.03.1978	10.03.1978
Spain (Note: By the government of Spain under the Restoration.)	04.09.1900	04.09.1900	04.09.1900	04.09.1900	04.09.1900	04.09.1900
Sri Lanka	09.02.1955	–	–	–	–	–
United Kingdoms of Sweden and Norway (Note: Ceased to be a state on 7 June 1905.)	04.09.1900	S	04.09.1900	04.09.1900	04.09.1900	04.09.1900
Sweden	17.06.1905	05.07.1907	17.06.1905	17.06.1905	17.06.1905	17.06.1905
Switzerland	29.12.1900	20.06.1907	29.12.1900	29.12.1900	29.12.1900	29.12.1900
Thailand (Note: Ratified as "Siam".)	04.09.1900	04.09.1900	04.09.1900	04.09.1900	04.09.1900	04.09.1900
Turkey (Note: Ratified as the Ottoman Empire.)	12.06.1907	12.06.1907	12.06.1907	S	12.06.1907	12.06.1907
Ukraine (Note: The Ukrainian SSR recognized the conventions ratified by the Russian Empire, "to the extent that the said Conventions do not conflict with the Charter of the United Nations." In 2015, Ukraine declared it considered itself bound from its independence in 1991 by way of succession to the conventions in force for the Soviet Union in the format and scope as envioned by (...) the USSR.)	04.04.1962	29.05.2015	29.05.2015	−	29.05.2015	29.05.2015
United Kingdom (Note: Ratified as the United Kingdom of Great Britain and Ireland.)	04.09.1900	04.09.1900	04.09.1900	–	30.08.1907	30.08.1907
United States	04.09.1900	09.04.1902	04.09.1900	S	–	–
Uruguay	17.06.1907	21.06.1906	21.06.1906	–	–	–
Venezuela	15.06.1907	01.03.1907	01.03.1907	–	–	–
Vietnam	29.12.2011	–	–	–	–	–
Kingdom of Serbia (Note: Ceased to be a state on 1 December 1918.)	11.05.1901	11.05.1901	11.05.1901	11.05.1901	11.05.1901	11.05.1901
Zimbabwe	19.09.1984	–	–	–	–	–
Current total number of parties (Note: Excludes states which ratified but subsequently withdrew ratification or ceased to exist)	71	51	51	Lapsed (Note: 24 parties when the treaty lapsed.)	35	35

== 1907 Hague Conventions ==
State	(I) dd.mm.yyyy	(II) dd.mm.yyyy	(III) dd.mm.yyyy	(IV) dd.mm.yyyy	(V) dd.mm.yyyy	(VI) dd.mm.yyyy	(VII) dd.mm.yyyy	(VIII) dd.mm.yyyy	(IX) dd.mm.yyyy	(X) dd.mm.yyyy	(XI) dd.mm.yyyy	(XII) dd.mm.yyyy	(XIII) dd.mm.yyyy	(XIV) dd.mm.yyyy
Albania	28.10.2011	–	–	–	–	–	–	–	–	–	–	–	–	–
Argentina	11.12.2024	S	S	S	S	S	S	S	S	S	S	S	S	S
Armenia	23.04.2025	–	–	–	–	–	–	–	–	–	–	–	–	–
Australia	23.12.1996	–	–	–	–	–	–	–	–	–	–	–	–	–
Austria-Hungary	27.11.1909	27.11.1909	27.11.1909	27.11.1909	27.11.1909	27.11.1909	27.11.1909	27.11.1909	27.11.1909	27.11.1909	27.11.1909	–	27.11.1909	S
Austria	12.11.1918	12.11.1918	12.11.1918	12.11.1918	12.11.1918	12.11.1918	12.11.1918	12.11.1918	12.11.1918	12.11.1918	12.11.1918	–	12.11.1918	–
Bahamas	14.04.2016	–	–	–	–	–	–	–	–	–	–	–	–	–
Bahrain	30.06.2008	–	–	–	–	–	–	–	–	–	–	–	–	–
Bangladesh	28.12.2011	–	–	–	–	–	–	–	–	–	–	–	–	–
Belarus	04.06.1962	04.06.1962	04.06.1962	04.06.1962	04.06.1962	04.06.1962	04.06.1962	–	04.06.1962	04.06.1962	–	–	04.06.1962	–
Belgium	08.08.1910	–	08.08.1910	08.08.1910	08.08.1910	08.08.1910	08.08.1910	08.08.1910	08.08.1910	08.08.1910	08.08.1910	S	08.08.1910	08.08.1910
Belize	22.11.2002	–	–	–	–	–	–	–	–	–	–	–	–	–
Benin	18.07.2005	–	–	–	–	–	–	–	–	–	–	–	–	–
Bolivia	27.11.1909	S	27.11.1909	27.11.1909	27.11.1909	S	S	S	27.11.1909	27.11.1909	S	S	S	27.11.1909
Botswana	03.02.2026	–	–	–	–	–	–	–	–	–	–	–	–	–
Brazil	05.01.1914	–	05.01.1914	05.01.1914	05.01.1914	05.01.1914	05.01.1914	05.01.1914	05.01.1914	05.01.1914	05.01.1914	–	05.01.1914	05.01.1914
Bulgaria (Note: Conventions (II, III, IV, V, VII, VIII, IX, X, XI, XII, XIII, XIV) were signed by Principality of Bulgaria.)	11.04.2000	S	S	S	S	S	S	S	S	S	S	S	S	S
Burkina Faso (Note: Ratification by Republic of Upper Volta.)	30.08.1961	–	–	–	–	–	–	–	–	–	–	–	–	–
Cambodia	07.01.1956	–	–	–	–	–	–	–	–	–	–	–	–	–
Cameroon	01.08.1961	–	–	–	–	–	–	–	–	–	–	–	–	–
Canada	10.05.1994	–	–	27.11.1909	–	–	–	–	–	–	–	–	–	–
Chile	19.11.1997	S	S	S	S	S	S	S	S	S	S	S	S	–
China (Note: Conventions (I, II, III, V, IX, X, XIII, XIV) during the Qing Dynasty and conventions (IV, VI, VII, VIII, XI) during the Republic of China.)	27.11.1909	15.01.1910	15.01.1910	10.05.1917	15.01.1910	10.05.1917	10.05.1917	10.05.1917	15.01.1910	27.11.1909	10.05.1917	–	15.01.1910	27.11.1909
Colombia	16.01.1997	S	S	S	S	S	S	S	S	S	S	S	S	S
Costa Rica	21.05.1999	–	–	–	–	–	–	–	–	–	–	–	–	–
Cuba	22.02.1912	S	S	22.02.1912	22.02.1912	22.02.1912	S	S	22.02.1912	22.02.1912	S	S	–	S
Cyprus	13.09.1993	–	–	–	–	–	–	–	–	–	–	–	–	–
Czechoslovakia (Note: Ceased to be a state on 1 January 1993.)	13.04.1922	–	–	–	–	–	–	–	–	–	–	–	–	–
Czech Republic	11.10.1993	–	–	–	–	–	–	–	–	–	–	–	–	–
Democratic Republic of the Congo	25.03.1961	–	–	–	–	–	–	–	–	–	–	–	–	–
Denmark	27.11.1909	27.11.1909	27.11.1909	27.11.1909	27.11.1909	27.11.1909	27.11.1909	27.11.1909	27.11.1909	27.11.1909	27.11.1909	S	27.11.1909	–
Djibouti	17.02.2016	–	–	–	–	–	–	–	–	–	–	–	–	–
Dominican Republic	09.07.1958	S	S	16.05.1958	S	S	–	S	S	S	S	–	S	S
Ecuador	S	S	S	S	S	S	S	S	S	S	S	–	S	S
El Salvador	27.11.1909	27.11.1909	27.11.1909	27.11.1909	27.11.1909	27.11.1909	27.11.1909	27.11.1909	27.11.1909	27.11.1909	27.11.1909	S	27.11.1909	27.11.1909
Egypt (Note: Ratified as the United Arab Republic)	05.09.1968	–	–	–	–	–	–	–	–	–	–	–	–	–
Eritrea	05.08.1997	–	–	–	–	–	–	–	–	–	–	–	–	–
Estonia	03.07.2003	–	–	–	–	–	–	–	–	–	–	–	–	–
Ethiopia	–	–	05.08.1935	05.08.1935	05.08.1935	05.08.1935	05.08.1935	31.05.1935	05.08.1935	05.08.1935	05.08.1935	–	05.08.1935	02.08.1935
Fiji	–	02.04.1973	02.04.1973	02.04.1973	–	–	02.04.1973	02.04.1973	02.04.1973	–	02.04.1973	–	–	02.04.1973
Finland	10.04.1922	10.04.1922	10.04.1922	10.04.1922	10.04.1922	10.04.1922	10.04.1922	10.04.1922	10.04.1922	10.04.1922	10.04.1922	–	10.04.1922	09.06.1922
France	07.10.1910	07.10.1910	07.10.1910	07.10.1910	07.10.1910	07.10.1910(W)	07.10.1910	07.10.1910	07.10.1910	07.10.1910	07.10.1910	S	07.10.1910	–
Georgia	21.01.2015	–	–	–	–	–	–	–	–	–	–	–	–	–
Germany	27.11.1909	27.11.1909	27.11.1909	27.11.1909	27.11.1909	27.11.1909	27.11.1909	27.11.1909	27.11.1909	27.11.1909	27.11.1909	–	27.11.1909	–
Greece	S	S	S	S	S	S	S	S	S	S	S	–	S	S
Guatemala	15.03.1911	15.03.1911	15.03.1911	15.03.1911	15.03.1911	15.03.1911	15.03.1911	15.03.1911	15.03.1911	15.03.1911	15.03.1911	S	15.03.1911	–
Guyana	26.11.1997	–	–	–	–	–	–	–	–	–	–	–	–	–
Haiti	02.02.1910	02.02.1910	02.02.1910	02.02.1910	02.02.1910	02.02.1910	02.02.1910	02.02.1910	02.02.1910	02.02.1910	02.02.1910	S	02.02.1910	02.02.1910
Honduras	01.12.1961	–	–	–	–	–	–	–	–	–	–	–	–	–
Hungary	16.11.1918	16.11.1918	16.11.1918	16.11.1918	16.11.1918	16.11.1918	16.11.1918	16.11.1918	16.11.1918	16.11.1918	16.11.1918	–	16.11.1918	–
Iceland	08.12.1955	08.12.1955	08.12.1955	08.12.1955	08.12.1955	08.12.1955	08.12.1955	08.12.1955	29.07.1955	08.12.1955	08.12.1955	–	08.12.1955	–
India	–	29.07.1950	29.07.1950	29.07.1950	–	–	29.07.1950	29.07.1950	29.07.1950	–	29.07.1950	–	–	29.07.1950
Iran	S	S	S	S	S	S	S	S	S	S	S	S	S	S
Iraq	31.08.1970	–	–	–	–	–	–	–	–	–	–	–	–	–
Indonesia	04.12.2025	–	–	–	–	–	–	–	–	–	–	–	–	–
Ireland	07.05.2002	–	–	–	–	–	–	–	–	–	–	–	–	–
Israel	18.04.1962	–	–	–	–	–	–	–	–	–	–	–	–	–
Italy	S	S	S	S	S	S	S	S	S	15.02.1937	S	–	S	–
Japan	13.12.1911	13.12.1911	13.12.1911	13.12.1911	13.12.1911	13.12.1911	13.12.1911	13.12.1911	13.12.1911	13.12.1911	13.12.1911	–	13.12.1911	–
Jordan	28.11.1991	–	–	–	–	–	–	–	–	–	–	–	–	–
Kenya	12.04.2006	–	–	–	–	–	–	–	–	–	–	–	–	–
South Korea	23.12.1999	–	–	–	–	–	–	–	–	–	–	–	–	–
Kosovo	06.11.2015	–	–	–	–	–	–	–	–	–	–	–	–	–
Kuwait	16.07.2003	–	–	–	–	–	–	–	–	–	–	–	–	–
Kyrgyzstan	04.06.1992	–	–	–	–	–	–	–	–	–	–	–	–	–
Laos	18.07.1955	18.07.1955	18.07.1955	18.07.1955	18.07.1955	–	18.07.1955	18.07.1955	18.07.1955	18.07.1955	18.07.1955	–	18.07.1955	–
Latvia	13.06.2001	–	–	–	–	–	–	–	–	08.04.1923	–	–	–	–
Lebanon	14.02.1968	–	–	–	–	–	–	–	–	–	–	–	–	–
Liberia	–	04.02.1914	04.02.1914	04.02.1914	04.02.1914	04.02.1914	04.02.1914	04.02.1914	04.02.1914	–	04.02.1914	–	04.02.1914	04.02.1914
Libya	04.07.1996	–	–	–	–	–	–	–	–	–	–	–	–	–
Liechtenstein	25.07.1994	–	–	–	–	–	–	–	–	–	–	–	–	–
Lithuania	10.11.2004	–	–	–	–	–	–	–	–	–	–	–	–	–
Luxembourg	05.09.1912	–	05.09.1912	05.09.1912	05.09.1912	05.09.1912	05.09.1912	05.09.1912	05.09.1912	05.09.1912	05.09.1912	–	05.09.1912	05.09.1912
Republic of Macedonia	19.12.2000	–	–	–	–	–	–	–	–	–	–	–	–	–
Madagascar	07.10.2009	–	–	–	–	–	–	–	–	–	–	–	–	–
Malaysia	07.03.2002	–	–	–	–	–	–	–	–	–	–	–	–	–
Malta	09.07.1968	–	–	–	–	–	–	–	–	–	–	–	–	–
Mexico	27.11.1909	27.11.1909(W)	27.11.1909	27.11.1909	27.11.1909	27.11.1909	27.11.1909	27.11.1909	27.11.1909	27.11.1909	27.11.1909	S	27.11.1909	–
Moldova	31.07.2025	–	–	–	–	–	–	–	–	–	–	–	–	–
Mongolia	15.03.2019	–	–	–	–	–	–	–	–	–	–	–	–	–
Principality of Montenegro	–	–	S	S	S	S	S	–	S	S	–	–	S	–
Morocco	05.04.2001	–	–	–	–	–	–	–	–	–	–	–	–	–
Netherlands	27.11.1909	27.11.1909	27.11.1909	27.11.1909	27.11.1909	27.11.1909	27.11.1909	27.11.1909	27.11.1909	27.11.1909	27.11.1909	S	27.11.1909	27.11.1909
New Zealand	13.04.2010	–	–	–	–	–	–	–	–	–	–	–	–	–
Nicaragua	16.12.1909	16.12.1909	16.12.1909	16.12.1909	16.12.1909	16.12.1909	16.12.1909	16.12.1909	16.12.1909	16.12.1909	16.12.1909	16.12.1909	16.12.1909	16.12.1909
Nigeria	18.12.1986	–	–	–	–	–	–	–	–	–	–	–	–	–
Norway	19.09.1910	19.09.1910	19.09.1910	19.09.1910	19.09.1910	19.09.1910	19.09.1910	19.09.1910	19.09.1910	19.09.1910	19.09.1910	S	19.09.1910	19.09.1910
Pakistan	–	05.08.1950	05.08.1950	05.08.1950	–	–	05.08.1950	05.08.1950	05.08.1950	–	–	–	–	05.08.1950
State of Palestine	30.10.2015 (Note: The Government of the Netherlands (as the depositary) published a notice of the deposit of an instrument of accession by Palestine. Amongst others the United States filed objections stating that only powers invited to the second peace conference or UN members could accede unilaterally. In March 2016, the Administrative Council of the Permanent Court of Arbitration took note of the membership of Palestine: 54 members voted in favour, while 25 abstained.)	–	–	02.04.2014	–	–	–	–	–	–	–	–	–	–
Panama	11.09.1911	11.09.1911	11.09.1911	11.09.1911	11.09.1911	11.09.1911	11.09.1911	11.09.1911	11.09.1911	11.09.1911	11.09.1911	S	11.09.1911	11.09.1911
Paraguay	25.04.1933	S	S	S	S	S	S	S	S	S	S	–	S	–
Peru	S	S	S	S	S	S	S	S	S	S	S	S	S	S
Philippines	14.07.2010	–	–	–	–	–	–	–	–	–	–	–	–	–
Poland (Note: Ratified as the government of the Second Polish Republic.)	27.03.1922	–	09.05.1925	09.05.1925	09.05.1925	31.05.1935	31.05.1935	–	31.05.1935	31.05.1935	31.05.1935	–	–	–
Portugal (Note: Ratified as the government of the First Portuguese Republic.)	13.04.1911	13.04.1911	13.04.1911	13.04.1911	13.04.1911	13.04.1911	13.04.1911	–	13.04.1911	13.04.1911	13.04.1911	–	13.04.1911	13.04.1911
Qatar	03.10.2005	–	–	–	–	–	–	–	–	–	–	–	–	–
Romania	01.03.1912	–	01.03.1912	01.03.1912	01.03.1912	01.03.1912	01.03.1912	01.03.1912	01.03.1912	01.03.1912	01.03.1912	–	01.03.1912	–
Russia	27.11.1909	27.11.1909	27.11.1909	27.11.1909	27.11.1909	27.11.1909	27.11.1909	–	27.11.1909	27.11.1909	–	–	27.11.1909	–
Rwanda	29.04.2011	–	–	–	–	–	–	–	–	–	–	–	–	–
São Tomé and Príncipe	05.09.2014	–	–	–	–	–	–	–	–	–	–	–	–	–
Saudi Arabia	21.11.2001	–	–	–	–	–	–	–	–	–	–	–	–	–
Senegal	01.08.1977	–	–	–	–	–	–	–	–	–	–	–	–	–
Kingdom of Serbia	–	–	S	S	S	S	S	S	S	S	S	–	S	–
Singapore	13.07.1993	–	–	–	–	–	–	–	–	–	–	–	–	–
Slovakia	26.04.1993	–	–	–	–	–	–	–	–	–	–	–	–	–
Slovenia	29.01.2004	–	–	–	–	–	–	–	–	–	–	–	–	–
South Africa	22.10.1998	10.03.1978	10.03.1978	10.03.1978	–	–	10.03.1978	10.03.1978	10.03.1978	–	10.03.1978	–	–	–
Spain	18.03.1913	18.03.1913	18.03.1913	–	18.03.1913	18.03.1913	18.03.1913	–	24.02.1913	18.03.1913	18.03.1913	–	–	–
Sudan	03.10.1966	–	–	–	–	–	–	–	–	–	–	–	–	–
Suriname	28.10.1992	–	–	–	–	–	–	–	–	–	–	–	–	–
Eswatini (Note: Ratification under the name of Swaziland.)	26.10.1970	–	–	–	–	–	–	–	–	–	–	–	–	–
Sweden	27.11.1909	–	27.11.1909	27.11.1909	27.11.1909	27.11.1909	27.11.1909	–	27.11.1909	27.11.1909	27.11.1909	S	27.11.1909	–
Switzerland	12.05.1910	–	12.05.1910	12.05.1910	12.05.1910	12.05.1910	12.05.1910	12.05.1910	12.05.1910	12.05.1910	12.05.1910	–	12.05.1910	12.05.1910
Thailand	12.03.1910	–	12.03.1910	12.03.1910	12.03.1910	12.03.1910	12.03.1910	12.03.1910	12.03.1910	12.03.1910	12.03.1910	S	12.03.1910	12.03.1910
Timor-Leste	22.07.2024	–	–	–	–	–	–	–	–	–	–	–	–	–
Togo	18.10.2004	–	–	–	–	–	–	–	–	–	–	–	–	–
Turkey	S	S	S	S	S	S	S	S	S	S	S	–	S	S
Uganda	01.03.1966	–	–	–	–	–	–	–	–	–	–	–	–	–
Ukraine	04.04.1962	29.05.2015	29.05.2015	29.05.2015	29.05.2015	29.05.2015	29.05.2015	–	29.05.2015	29.05.2015	–	–	29.05.2015	–
United Arab Emirates	06.11.2008	–	–	–	–	–	–	–	–	–	–	–	–	–
United Kingdom (Note: Conventions (II, III, IV, V, VI, VII, VIII, IX, X, XI, XIII, XIV) was by the United Kingdom of Great Britain and Ireland.)	13.08.1970	27.11.1909	27.11.1909	27.11.1909	S	27.11.1909(W)	27.11.1909	27.11.1909	27.11.1909	S	27.11.1909	–	S	27.11.1909
United States	27.11.1909	27.11.1909	27.11.1909	27.11.1909	27.11.1909	–	–	27.11.1909	27.11.1909	27.11.1909	27.11.1909	S	03.12.1909	27.11.1909
Uruguay	S	S	S	S	S	S	–	S	S	S	S	S	S	S
Vanuatu	12.06.2024	–	–	–	–	–	–	–	–	–	–	–	–	–
Venezuela	S	–	S	S	S	S	S	S	S	S	S	–	S	–
Vietnam	29.12.2011	–	–	–	–	–	–	–	–	–	–	–	–	–
Zambia	01.11.1999	–	–	–	–	–	–	–	–	–	–	–	–	–
Current total number of parties	102	29	40	43	36	32	38	32	41	37	35	None (Note: Nicaragua ratified the treaty, but it never entered into force.)	32	22
