= Hague Conventions of 1899 and 1907 =

Yielded international treaties and declarations on the laws of war

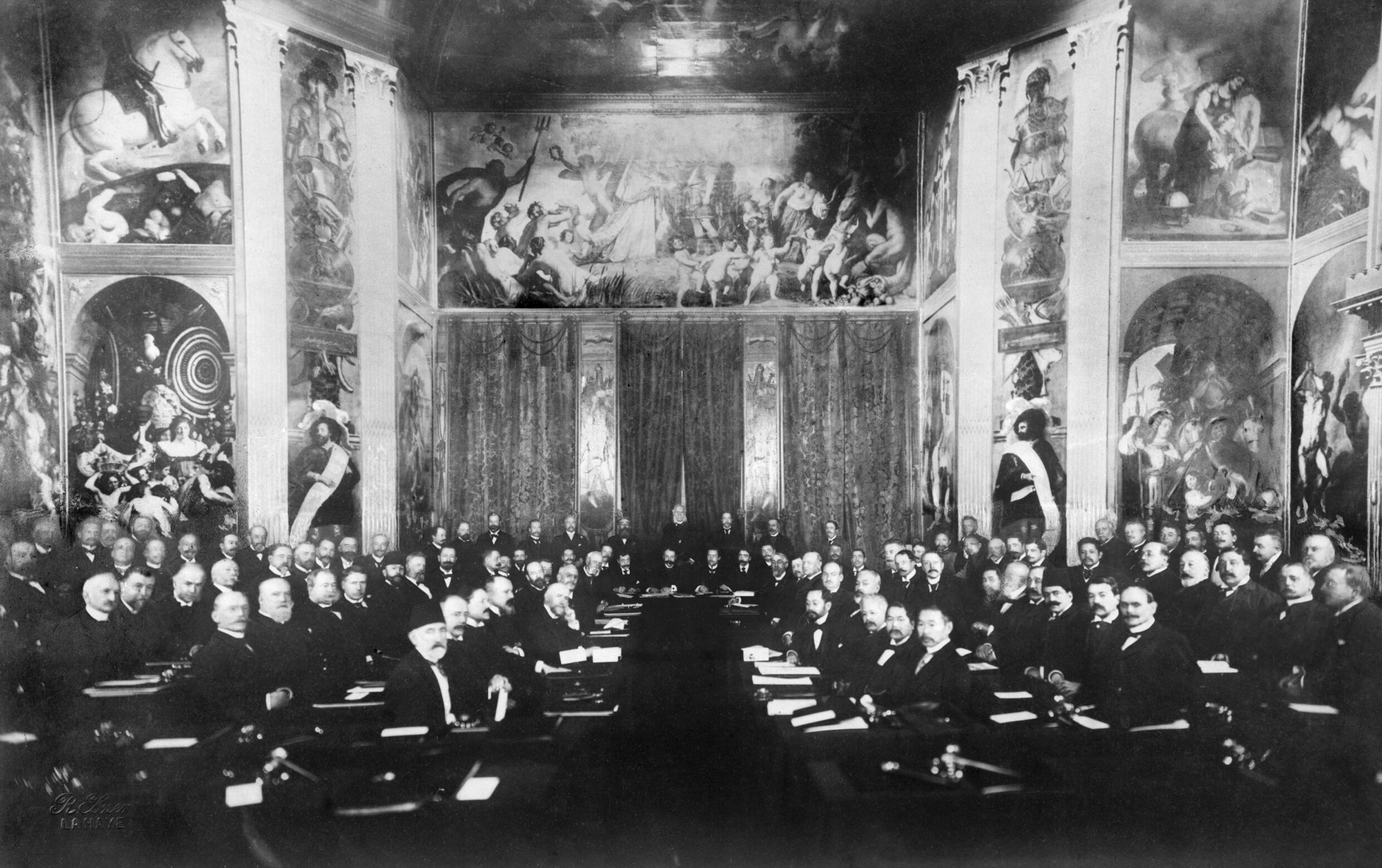
The First Hague Conference in 1899: A meeting in the Oranjezaal (Orange Hall) of Huis ten Bosch palace

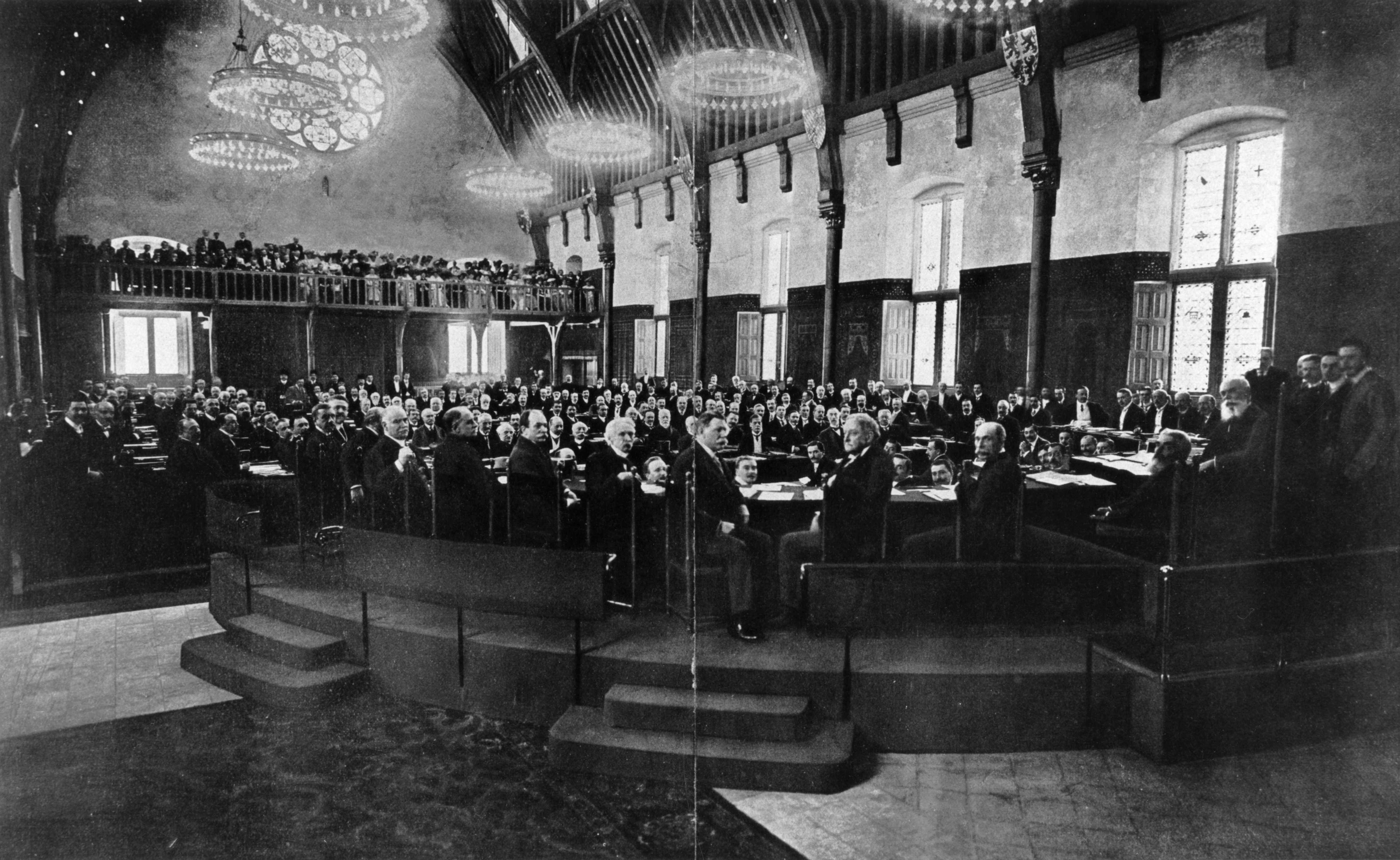
The Second Hague Conference in the Ridderzaal (1907)

The Hague Conventions of 1899 and 1907 are a series of international treaties and declarations negotiated at two international peace conferences at The Hague in the Netherlands, the First Hague Conference of 1899 and the Second Hague Conference of 1907. Along with the Geneva Conventions, the Hague Conventions were among the first formal statements of the laws of war and war crimes in the body of secular international law. A third conference was planned for 1914 and later rescheduled for 1915, but it did not take place because of the start of World War I.

The most tangible outcome of the First Hague Conference of 1899 was the creation of the Permanent Court of Arbitration, the first global mechanism for the peaceful resolution of international disputes.

The provisions of the 1907 Hague Regulations, "have come to be recognized as customary law; hence they apply regardless of whether parties to the conflicts have ratified" them.

== History ==
The Hague Conventions of 1899 and 1907 were the first multilateral treaties that addressed the conduct of warfare and were largely based on the Lieber Code, which was signed and issued by US President Abraham Lincoln to the Union Forces of the United States on 24 April 1863, during the American Civil War. The Lieber Code was the first official comprehensive codified law that set out regulations for behavior in times of martial law; protection of civilians and civilian property and punishment of transgression; deserters, prisoners of war, hostages, and pillaging; partisans; spies; truces and prisoner exchange; parole of former rebel troops; the conditions of any armistice, and respect for human life; assassination and murder of soldiers or citizens in hostile territory; and the status of individuals engaged in a state of civil war against the government.

As such, the code was widely regarded as the best summary of the first customary laws and customs of war in the 19th century. It was welcomed and adopted by military establishments of other nations. The 1874 Brussels Declaration, which was never adopted by all major nations, listed 56 articles that drew inspiration from the Lieber Code. Much of the regulations in the Hague Conventions borrowed heavily from the Lieber Code.

== Subject matter ==
Both conferences included negotiations concerning disarmament, the laws of war and war crimes. A major effort in both conferences was the creation of a binding international court for compulsory arbitration to settle international disputes, which was considered necessary to replace the institution of war.

This effort failed at both conferences. Instead, a voluntary forum for arbitration, the Permanent Court of Arbitration, was established. Most of the countries present, including the United States, United Kingdom, Russia, France, China and Persia, favoured a process for binding international arbitration, but the provision was vetoed by a few countries, led by Germany.

== Hague Convention of 1899 ==
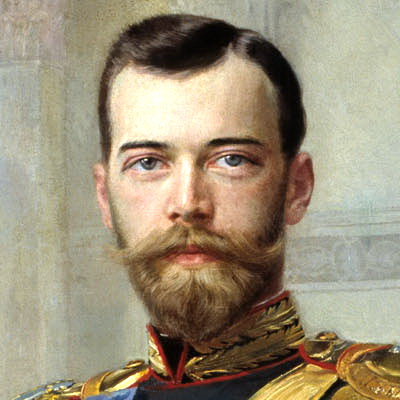
Tsar Nicholas II of Russia

The First Hague Conference came from a proposal on 24 August 1898 by Russian Tsar Nicholas II. Nicholas and Count Mikhail Nikolayevich Muravyov, his foreign minister, were instrumental in initiating the conference. The conference opened on 18 May 1899, the Tsar's birthday. The treaties, declarations, and final act of the conference were signed on 29 July of that year, and they entered into force on 4 September 1900. What is referred to as the Hague Convention of 1899 consisted of three main treaties and three additional declarations.

=== (I) Convention for the Pacific Settlement of International Disputes ===
This convention included the creation of the Permanent Court of Arbitration, which exists to this day. The section was ratified by all major powers and many smaller powers – 26 signatories in total. All signatories would ratify by 1904, except the Ottoman Empire which ratified in 1907.

=== (II) Convention with respect to the Laws and Customs of War on Land ===
This voluminous convention contains the laws to be used in all wars on land between signatories. It specifies the treatment of prisoners of war, includes the provisions of the Geneva Convention of 1864 for the treatment of the wounded, and forbids the use of poisons, the killing of enemy combatants who have surrendered, looting of a town or place, and the attack or bombardment of undefended towns or habitations. Inhabitants of occupied territories may not be forced into military service against their own country and collective punishment is forbidden.

=== (III) Convention for the Adaptation to Maritime Warfare of the Principles of the Geneva Convention of 22 August 1864 ===
This convention provides for the protection of marked hospital ships and requires them to treat the wounded and shipwrecked sailors of all belligerent parties. It too was ratified by all major powers.

=== (IV) Three Declarations ===
==== (IV,1) Declaration concerning the Prohibition of the Discharge of Projectiles and Explosives from Balloons or by Other New Analogous Methods ====
This declaration provides that, for a period of five years, in any war between signatory powers, no projectiles or explosives would be launched from balloons, "or by other new methods of a similar nature". The declaration was ratified by all the major powers except the United Kingdom and the United States.

==== (IV,2) Declaration concerning the Prohibition of the Use of Projectiles with the Sole Object to Spread Asphyxiating Poisonous Gases ====
This declaration states that, in any war between signatory powers, the parties will abstain from using projectiles "the sole object of which is the diffusion of asphyxiating or deleterious gases". Ratified by all major powers, except the United States.

==== (IV,3) Declaration concerning the Prohibition of the Use of Bullets which can Easily Expand or Change their Form inside the Human Body such as Bullets with a Hard Covering which does not Completely Cover the Core, or containing Indentations ====
This declaration states that, in any war between signatory powers, the parties will abstain from using "bullets which expand or flatten easily in the human body". This directly banned soft-point bullets (which had a partial metal jacket and an exposed tip) and "cross-tipped" bullets (which had a cross-shaped incision in their tip to aid in expansion, nicknamed "dum dums" from the Dum Dum Arsenal in India). It was ratified by all major powers, except the United States.

== Hague Convention of 1907 ==
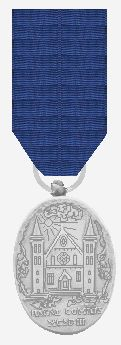
Commemorative medal of the 1907 convention

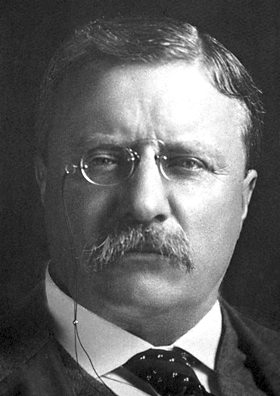
Theodore Roosevelt

The Second Hague Conference, in 1907, resulted in conventions containing only few major advancements from the 1899 Convention. However, the meeting of major powers did prefigure later 20th-century attempts at international cooperation.

The second conference was called at the suggestion of U.S. President Theodore Roosevelt in 1904. It was postponed because of the war between Russia and Japan. The Second Peace Conference was held from 15 June to 18 October 1907. The intent of the conference was to expand upon the 1899 Hague Convention by modifying some parts and adding new topics; in particular, the 1907 conference had an increased focus on naval warfare.

The British attempted to secure the limitation of armaments, but these efforts were defeated by the other powers, led by Germany, which feared a British attempt to stop the growth of the German fleet. As Britain had the world's largest navy, limits on naval expansion would preserve that dominant position. Germany also rejected proposals for compulsory arbitration. However, the conference did enlarge the machinery for voluntary arbitration and established conventions regulating the collection of debts, rules of war, and the rights and obligations of neutrals.

The treaties, declarations, and final act of the Second Conference were signed on 18 October 1907; they entered into force on 26 January 1910. The 1907 Convention consists of thirteen treaties—of which twelve were ratified and entered into force—and one declaration.

=== (I) Convention for the Pacific Settlement of International Disputes ===
This convention confirms and expands on Convention (I) of 1899. As of February 2017, this convention is in force for 102 states, and 116 states have ratified one or both of the 1907 Convention (I) and the 1899 Convention (I), which together are the founding documents of the Permanent Court of Arbitration.

=== (II) Convention respecting the Limitation of the Employment of Force for Recovery of Contract Debts ===
This convention requires debts between contracting parties to be settled by arbitration (as set out in Convention I) rather than war, unless the debtor refuses to negotiate or reneges on an agreed settlement.

=== (III) Convention relative to the Opening of Hostilities ===
This convention sets out the accepted procedure for a state making a declaration of war. It provides the basis on which, in international law, war reparations may be demanded.

=== (IV) Convention respecting the Laws and Customs of War on Land ===
Parties to Convention number IV: Convention respecting the laws and customs of war on land. Countries in purple are founding signatories. Montenegro and Serbia were also signatories, but their successor Yugoslavia was never a party. Some other territories shown as not being parties were bound as part of contracting parties, e.g. Ukraine (Russia) and Bohemia (Austria).

This convention confirms, with minor modifications, the provisions of Convention (II) of 1899. All major powers ratified it.

=== (V) Convention relative to the Rights and Duties of Neutral Powers and Persons in case of War on Land ===
Sources:

=== (VI) Convention relative to the Legal Position of Enemy Merchant Ships at the Start of Hostilities ===
Sources:

=== (VII) Convention relative to the Conversion of Merchant Ships into War-ships ===
Sources:

=== (VIII) Convention relative to the Laying of Automatic Submarine Contact Mines ===
Sources:

=== (IX) Convention concerning Bombardment by Naval Forces in Time of War ===
Sources:

=== (X) Convention for the Adaptation to Maritime Warfare of the Principles of the Geneva Convention (of 6 July 1906) ===
This convention updated Convention (III) of 1899 to reflect the amendments that had been made to the 1864 Geneva Convention. Convention (X) was ratified by all major states except Britain. It was subsequently superseded by the Second Geneva Convention.

=== (XI) Convention relative to Certain Restrictions with regard to the Exercise of the Right of Capture in Naval War ===
Sources:

=== (XII) Convention relative to the Establishment of an International Prize Court ===
This convention would have established the International Prize Court for the resolution of conflicting claims relating to captured ships during wartime. It is the one convention that never came into force. It was ratified only by Nicaragua.

=== (XIII) Convention concerning the Rights and Duties of Neutral Powers in Naval War ===
Sources:

=== (XIV) Declaration Prohibiting the Discharge of Projectiles and Explosives from Balloons ===
This declaration extended the provisions of Declaration (IV,1) of 1899 to the close of the planned Third Peace Conference (which never took place). Among the major powers, this was ratified only by China, Britain, and the United States.

=== Participants ===
The Brazilian delegation was led by Ruy Barbosa, whose contributions are seen today by some analysts as essential for the defense of the principle of legal equality of nations.

The British delegation included Sir Edward Fry, Sir Ernest Satow, the 11th Lord Reay (Donald James Mackay) and Sir Henry Howard as delegates, and Eyre Crowe as a technical delegate.

The Russian delegation was led by Friedrich Martens.

The Uruguayan delegation was led by José Batlle y Ordóñez, a defender of the idea of compulsory arbitration.

The French delegation included Louis Renault, Léon Bourgeois, and Paul Henri d'Estournelles de Constant. d'Estournelles de Constant was a member of the French delegation for both the 1899 and 1907 delegations. He later won the Nobel Peace Prize in 1909 for his efforts.

The U.S. representative, with the rank of ambassador, was former American Bar Association president U. M. Rose.

The main representative of the Chinese Empire was Lu Zhengxiang, who would become Prime Minister of the Republic of China in 1912. Also in attendance on behalf of China was former U.S. Secretary of State John Watson Foster. China's main military representative was Colonel Ding Shiyuan(丁士源), whose suggestion regarding the need for a more specific legal definition of "war" was rejected by most of the Western participants.

=== Critique of Hague meeting ===
At the same time an International Socialist Congress was standing in Stuttgart, in which the British delegate Harry Quelch labelled the Hague Convention a "thieves' supper". German authorities were swift in expelling Quelch from the country for his remarks, an action which boosted British esteem in the eyes of their radical peers.

== Geneva Protocol to The Hague Conventions — 1925 ==
Though not negotiated in The Hague, the Geneva Protocol to the Hague Conventions is considered an addition to the Conventions. Signed on 17 June 1925 and entering into force on 8 February 1928, its single article permanently bans the use of all forms of chemical and biological warfare in interstate armed conflicts. The protocol grew out of the increasing public outcry against chemical warfare following the use of mustard gas and similar agents in World War I, and fears that chemical and biological warfare could lead to horrific consequences in any future war. The protocol has since been augmented by the Biological Weapons Convention (1972) and the Chemical Weapons Convention (1993).

== Legacy ==
Many of the rules laid down at the Hague Conventions were violated in World War I. The German invasion of neutral Luxembourg and Belgium in August 1914 in order to outflank France, for instance, was a violation of Convention (V) of 1907, which states that belligerents must not violate neutral territory and move troops across said territory. Poison gas was introduced and used by almost all major belligerents throughout the war, in violation of the Declaration (IV, 2) of 1899 and Convention (IV) of 1907, which explicitly forbade the use of "poison or poisoned weapons".

Writing in 1918, the German international law scholar and neo-Kantian pacifist Walther Schücking called the assemblies the "international union of Hague conferences". Schücking saw the Hague conferences as a nucleus of a future international federation that was to meet at regular intervals to administer justice and develop international law procedures for the peaceful settlement of disputes, asserting that "a definite political union of the states of the world has been created with the First and Second Conferences".

After World War II, the judges of the military tribunal of the Trial of German Major War Criminals at Nuremberg Trials found that by 1939, the rules laid down in the 1907 Hague Convention IV – Laws and Customs of War on Land were "recognized by all civilized nations" and were regarded as declaratory of the laws and customs of war. Under this post-war decision, a country did not have to have ratified the 1907 Hague Convention on Land Warfare in order to be bound by them. (Germany was in any case a signatory since 1909.)

The Hague Conventions of 1899 and 1907 continue to stand as symbols of the need for restrictions on war and the desirability of avoiding it altogether. They still have an important bearing on the international law of neutrality, although more recently varied by the United Nations Charter and various United Nations Security Council decisions. In 2002, the International Committee of the Red Cross stated:

The sources of the international law of neutrality are customary international law and, for certain questions, international treaties, in particular the Paris Declaration of 1856, the 1907 Hague Convention No. V respecting the Rights and Duties of Neutral Powers and Persons in Case of War on Land, the 1907 Hague Convention No. XIII concerning the Rights and Duties of Neutral Powers in Naval War, the four 1949 Geneva Conventions and Additional Protocol I of 1977.

Since 2000, Convention (I) of 1907 on the Pacific Settlement of International Disputes has been ratified by 20 additional states.

== See also ==
- List of parties to the Hague Conventions of 1899 and 1907
- American Peace Society
- Antimilitarism
- Command responsibility
- Martens Clause
- Militarism
- Rule of Law in Armed Conflicts Project
- Saint Petersburg Declaration of 1868 (Declaration Renouncing the Use, in Time of War, of Explosive Projectiles Under 400 Grammes Weight)
- World Federation

== Sources ==
- Avalon Project at Yale Law School on The Laws of War—Contains the full texts of both the 1899 and 1907 conventions, among other treaties.
- ICRC International Humanitarian Law – Treaties & Documents, contains full texts and ratifying states of both the 1899 and 1907 conventions, among other treaties.
- List of signatory powers of the Convention for the Pacific Settlement of International Disputes
- The Hague conventions and declarations of 1899 and 1907, by James Brown Scott (ed.) Contains the texts of all conventions and the ratifying countries as of 1915.
- Hudson, Manley O. (January 1931). "Present Status of the Hague Conventions of 1899 and 1907". The American Journal of International Law. 25 (1): 114–117. doi:10.2307/2189634. JSTOR 2189634. S2CID 147254447.
- Lee, Jin Hyuck. The First Hague Peace Conference 1899 as portrayed in Punch
- Schlichtmann, Klaus (2003). "Japan, Germany and the Idea of the two Hague Peace Conferences". Journal of Peace Research. 40 (4): 377–394. doi:10.1177/00223433030404002. S2CID 145698064.
- Schücking, Walther (1918). The International Union of the Hague Conferences. Oxford: The Clarendon Press.
- Trueblood, Benjamin F. (1899). The Federation of the World. Boston and New York: Houghton, Mifflin & Co.
- Robinson, James J. (September 1960). "Surprise Attack: Crime at Pearl Harbor and Now". ABA Journal 46(9). American Bar Association. p. 978.
