= Emergency Response Guidebook =

Reference book for emergency response personnel

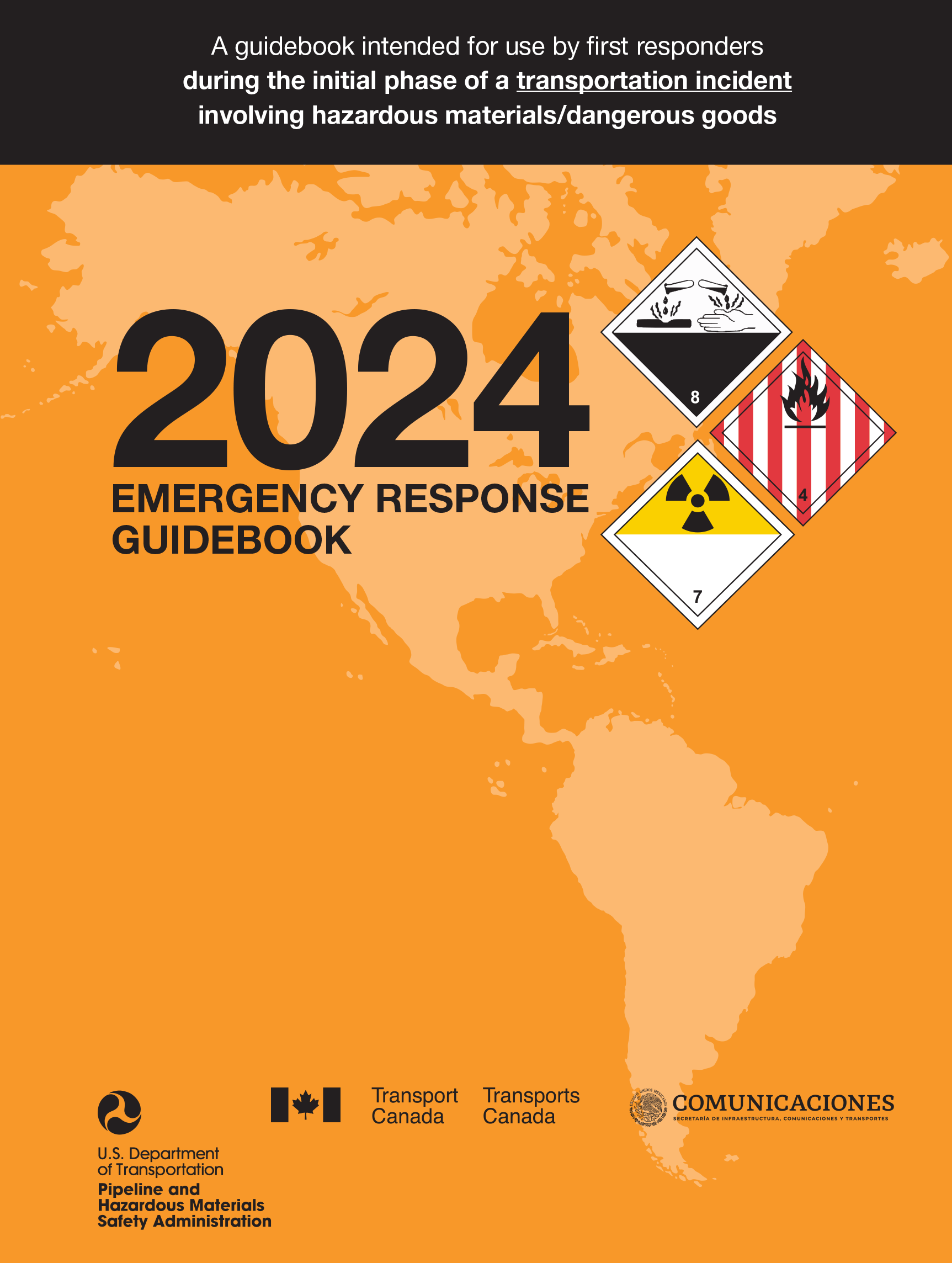
- 2024 English cover
- Author: United States Department of Transportation, Transport Canada, Secretariat of Infrastructure, Communications and Transportation of Mexico
- Subject: Hazardous Materials
- Published: Every four years
- Publication date: 04/2024
- Pages: 389
- Website: www.phmsa.dot.gov
- Alternate titles: Guía de Respuesta en Caso de Emergencia Guide Des Mesures D'Urgence

The Emergency Response Guidebook: A Guidebook for First Responders During the Initial Phase of a Dangerous Goods/Hazardous Materials Transportation Incident (ERG) is used by emergency response personnel (such as firefighters, paramedics and police officers) in Canada, Mexico, and the United States when responding to a transportation emergency involving hazardous materials. First responders in Argentina, Brazil, and Colombia have recently begun using the ERG as well. It is produced by the United States Department of Transportation's Pipeline and Hazardous Materials Safety Administration, Transport Canada, and the Secretariat of Infrastructure, Communications and Transportation (Mexico).

== History ==
The first iteration was published by the United States Department of Transportation (USDOT) in December 1973, as Emergency Services Guide for Selected Hazardous Materials. This first document was 63 pages long, containing information for only 29 chemicals. The next version, appeared in May 1976, as Hazardous Materials - Emergency Action Guide. A revised version would be released in January 1977, which added an image of the relevant, newly adopted hazardous material placards to each substance's entry. These early documents were very barebones, containing only 29 to 43 materials, mostly flammable substances, corrosives and toxic gases.

1980 saw the first year of the Emergency Response Guidebook in its modern form. The book grew significantly from 87 pages in prior editions, to just over 140 pages, introducing the color coded sections, alongside general guide pages that described the response to a wide number of similar substances, replacing the specific entries for individual substances. Placard charts for devising responses when the exact substances isn't known and Chemtrec as an advice resource would also make their first appearances in 1980. New editions would be published in 1984, 1987, 1990, 1993. The 1996 edition would be a turning point, released as North American Emergency Response Guidebook, this edition would see formal involvement of Transport Canada (TC) and he Secretariat of Communications and Transportation (SCT) of Mexico for the first time, with their national emblems appearing alongside the USDOT logo and contact information in the rear of the book. This would also see the start of the four year refresh cycle. The book's title reverted to the previous Emergency Response Guidebook in the 2000 edition.

From the 2004 edition, information on responding to terrorism involving hazardous materials was included. 2004 would also mark the involvement of the Chemistry Information Center for Emergencies (CIQUIME) of Argentina assisting in development of the guidebook. New editions have been published in 2004, 2008, 2012, 2016, 2020, and most recently 2024.

== Guidebook Contents ==
It is primarily a guide to aid first responders in quickly identifying the specific or generic hazards of the material(s) involved in the incident, and protecting themselves and the general public during the initial response phase of the incident.

— Emergency Response Guidebook (2012)

The Emergency Response Guide is intended to give first responders (firefighters, police officers) prompt advice during the initial stages of an emergency, such as a fire or chemical leak resulting from a transportation accident, such as a train derailment or crash involving a truck. It is primarily intended to respond to transportation accidents involving railroads, highways and pipelines. While it can be used with incidents involving aircraft, ships and permanent structures, the advice may not be suitable. First responders are expected to transition away from using the ERG as soon as possible, consulting better information sources, such as emergency response resources through the manufacturer or shipper, or emergency response organizations such as ChemTrec, Canutec, Cenacom, etc.

Since the 1980s, the ERG has used a layout that divides the book into six color-coded sections (white [uncolored], yellow, blue, orange, green, and a second white [uncolored]). The blue and yellow sections assist in connecting a substance to a specific "Guide" which provides appropriate response to the substance in question. The Orange Section, consists of 62 "Guides", that identify the primary hazards associated with the applicable general category of hazardous material and general guidance on how to respond to incidents involving that general category of hazardous material. Substances that are hazardous enough to demand a widespread evacuation, such as chlorine, are listed in the Green Section. The white sections provide other information to support the guidebook, such as contact numbers for expert chemical information sources, glossary, decontamination and protective clothing.

The document is formally published in three languages: English, French, and Spanish. It has been translated in to a number of other languages by third parties, including Mandarin, German, Hebrew, Japanese, Portuguese, Korean, Hungarian, Polish, Turkish and Thai.

=== White Section (front) ===
The first section, with white page (uncolored) borders, provides the following:

- Information regarding reading and understanding shipping documents
- A flowchart for how to use the guidebook to respond to an incident
- General guidance for responding to any hazardous material incident
- Basic information on the hazard classification system and the associated placards/labels
- Guide recommendations for situations where materials are unknown, and must be identified by:
  - placards,
  - rail cars
  - truck trailers
- General safety precautions
- Information on labels for Globally Harmonized System of Classification and Labelling of Chemicals
- Hazard identification numbers, (Used in European & South American placards systems)
- Specific guidance for incidents involving pipelines

=== Yellow Section ===
The second section, with yellow page borders, references the material in order of its assigned 4-digit UN/NA number (Called "ID No." in the ERG) and identifies the appropriate guide number to reference in the Orange Section and its official name per UN regulations. Chemical/biological warfare agents don't appear in this section, starting in the 2024 edition. Items highlighted in green in this section will have evacuation distances included in the Green Section.

=== Blue Section ===
The third section, with blue page borders, references the material in alphabetical order of its official name and identifies the appropriate guide number to reference in the Orange Section) and its 4-digit UN/NA number. Items highlighted in green in this section will also have evacuation distances included in the Green Section. As with the yellow section, chemical/biological warfare agents don't appear in this section, starting in the 2024 edition.

=== Orange Section ===
The fourth section, with orange page borders, includes the actual response guides. Each guide is broken into three primary sections: "Potential Hazards", "Public Safety", and "Emergency Response". Each of the 62 guides provides safety recommendations and directions on how to proceed during the initial response phase (first thirty minutes) of the incident. It includes "health" and "fire or explosion" potential hazard information (with the more dangerous hazard listed first). For example, "the material gives off irritating vapors, easily ignited by heat, reactive with water"; "highly toxic, may be fatal if inhaled, swallowed or absorbed through skin"; etc.

Next this section includes information for responders on appropriate protective clothing and possible evacuation information for either spill or fire is given. It also includes information on fighting fires (example, do not apply water to sodium), warnings for spills or leaks, and special directions for first aid (example, not to give mouth-to-mouth resuscitation if the materials are toxic).

There are two special guides in this section: "General First Aid", which provides basic first aid information when dealing with an individual exposed to a hazardous material, and doesn't correspond to a specific hazardous material, and is unnumbered. The other, is Guide #111 - Mixed Load/Unidentified Cargo, which is for use in situations where either multiple hazardous materials are involved, or even basic information is unavailable, such as when a railcar or truck is buried under vehicles/debris or obscured by fire or smoke.

=== Green Section ===
The fifth section, with green page borders, suggests initial evacuation or shelter in place distances (protective action distances) for spills of materials that are Toxic-by-Inhalation (TIH). These distances vary based on the size of the spill (small or large) and whether the incident occurs during the day or at night. Only materials that were highlighted in green in the Yellow and Blue Sections are included in the Green Section. This section also includes information regarding toxic gases that are produced when certain materials are spilled in water (as identified previously in this section). Finally, this section includes some very specific evacuation details for six common materials.

=== White Section (back) ===
The sixth section, with white page (uncolored) borders, provides the following:

- Additional instructions on how to use the guidebook
- Information regarding protective clothing and equipment
- Instructions on fire and spill control
- Responding to lithium-ion battery and electric vehicle fires
- BLEVE (boiling liquid expanding vapor explosion) safety precautions
- Beginning with the 2004 edition, information specifically for hazardous materials being used for terrorism
- Glossary of terms used in the ERG
- Contact information for the various countries

== See also ==
- Dangerous goods
- Emergency management
- Wireless Information System for Emergency Responders
