= Women's Institute for Secondary Education and Research =

WISER
- Formation: 2010
- Type: NGO
- Legal status: Nonprofit organization
- Headquarters: Muhuru Bay, Kenya
- Region served: Kenya
- Website: http://wisergirls.org/

The Women's Institute for Secondary Education and Research (WISER) International is a non-profit organization providing high-quality girls' education, holistic health resources, and community-oriented support in Muhuru Bay, Kenya.

== History ==
=== Relationship with Egerton University ===
For the last five years, Duke University has been developing and deepening its relationship with Egerton University in Kenya.

The relationship is a collaboration between Dr. Sherryl Broverman, Associate Professor of the Practice in Biology at Duke and Dr. Rose Odhiambo at Egerton University. Dr. Broverman initially consulted with the Institute for Women, Gender and Development Studies (IWGDS), which Dr. Odhiambo directs, on the development and assessment of a course on HIV/AIDS for a general audience. Egerton is one of the few universities in Kenya that mandates a course on HIV/AIDS for all undergraduates, and has been a national leader in infusing gender issues into the dialog about HIV/AIDS.

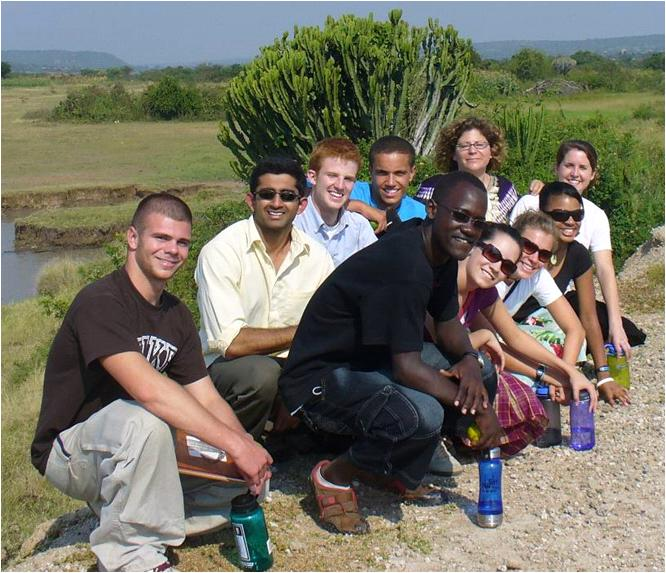
Duke students in Kenya

For five years, Dr. Broverman has traveled to Kenya with students to do a needs assessment of WISER's Kenyan peers and develop a community-based research project for students at Duke.

In subsequent years, Duke students have worked with Egerton students to develop an HIV/AIDS peer education manual; a manual on the interaction between gender, health, and development; and a documentary of Kenyans living openly and 'positively' with AIDS. Egerton graduates who have participated in its HIV/AIDS education and training programs are now being selectively recruited by the Ministry of Education.

In 2005 the National Science Foundation awarded a grant to Dr. Broverman to develop an international collaborative learning program that linked students at Duke and Egerton throughout the semester via an email dialog and joint homework assignments. Duke University also provided funds to install a satellite system for enhanced Internet connection at the IWGDS. Dr. Broverman's award from the Division of Undergraduate Education at NSF is the first international education program funded by that agency. The NSF has recently made the development of research and education programs—such as the one between Duke and Egerton—a high priority that increase the ability of future leaders to work in a global society.

=== The Birth of WISER ===
In the summer of 2006, Dr. Broverman and a team of seven undergraduate students lived for one month on the Rabwao Secondary School campus to research obstacles to girls' educational success. Interviews and focus groups were held with all 250 students, all teachers and administrators, local primary school teachers from the nine local schools, parents, the area chiefs, representatives from the Ministry of Education, and Provincial government officials.

At the same time, town hall meetings were held in three languages in order to determine the needs of the community. It became clear that the citizens of Muhuru Bay believed that a private boarding school for girls would be an essential step towards improving the educational performance of local girls and their opportunities in the future. To reflect the strong community support and commitment to the WISER project, the Chief of Muhuru Bay donated 10 acres (40,000 m^{2}) of land to be used as the site for the school. WISER is currently working with an eight person in-country advisory team to open WISER in Muhuru Bay within the next few years.
