= Flags of Japanese prefectures =

Each modern Japanese prefecture has a unique flag, most often a bicolour, geometric, highly stylised design, and often incorporating the characters of the Japanese writing system and resembling minimalistic company logos. The heraldic badges worn by warriors in medieval Japan (mon) were forerunners of the modern emblems used in the prefectural flags.

A distinct feature of these flags is that they use a palette of colours not usually found in flags, including orange, purple, aquamarine and brown.

Some prefectures also have alternative official flags called "symbol flags" (シンボル旗). They may be used on less formal occasions. Famous symbol flags include the one used in Tokyo.

== Flags by prefecture ==
Flag	Prefecture	Geocode	Date of adoption	Description
	Aichi	JP-23	August 15, 1950	Stylised hiragana あ ("a") . The emblem also expresses sunrise and wave to indicate Aichi's location facing the Pacific Ocean.
	Akita	JP-05	November 3, 1959	Stylized katakana character ア ("a") on a dark red field.
	Aomori	JP-02	January 1, 1961	Stylised map of the prefecture in green on a white field.
	Chiba	JP-12	July 29, 1963	A blue field with チバ ("Chiba") stylized into a rapeseed flower.
	Ehime	JP-38	May 5, 1952	Horizontal tricolor of yellow, green and yellow with an orange blossom.
	Fukui	JP-18	March 28, 1952	A dark blue field charged with a circular emblem consisting of the katakana フクイ ("Fukui") stylized into a young leaf growing next to two other leaves.
	Fukuoka	JP-40	May 10, 1966	The hiragana ふく ("fuku") stylized into a plum blossom.
	Fukushima	JP-07	October 23, 1968	An orange field with the hiragana character ふ ("fu") stylized into a circle toward the hoist side. The slightly off-center placement is said to represent "strength and endless progress". It is also reminiscent of the shape of a peach, as Fukushima is one of the top peach producing regions in Japan.
	Gifu	JP-21	August 10, 1932	A white field charged with a green stylized "岐" ("gi") inside of a green circle.
	Gunma	JP-10	October 25, 1968	A purple field charged with three crescents and the old version of “群” (“gun”) with “君” on the top and “羊” on the bottom.
	Hiroshima (detail)	JP-34	July 23, 1966	Katakana character ヒ ("hi") stylized into two attached circular crescents on a maroon red field.
	Hokkaido (detail)	JP-01	May 1, 1967	A navy blue field charged with a red 7-pointed star with a thick white fringe around the star.
	Hyōgo	JP-28	June 10, 1964	Kanji character 兵 ("Hyō") stylized into waves on a light blue field.
	Ibaraki	JP-08	November 13, 1991	A white stylized rose bud on a field of indigo.
	Ishikawa	JP-17	October 1, 1972	Stylized kanji of 石川 (Ishikawa) on a cerulean blue field.
	Iwate (detail)	JP-03	March 6, 1965	A bluish-gray field charged with the kanji 岩 (iwa) stylized with vertical and horizontal symmetry.
	Kagawa	JP-37	October 1, 1977	An olive green field charged with a stylized and rotated katakana カ ("ka").
	Kagoshima (detail)	JP-46	March 10, 1967	A black horseshoe shape (representing the Satsuma and Osumi Peninsulas) with a small dent on the bottom-right corner of the emblem (representing Shibushi Bay) surrounding a red circle (representing Sakurajima).
	Kanagawa	JP-14	November 4, 1948	Stylized Kanji character 神 (the first character from 神奈川 "Kanagawa") in red on a white field.
	Kōchi	JP-39	April 15, 1953	A maroon red field charged with と ("to", from Tosa) and コ ("ko", from Kōchi) stylized into a sword pointing up.
	Kumamoto	JP-43	March 31, 1966	A maroon field charged with a white ク ("ku") reminiscent of the shape of Kyushu.
	Kyoto	JP-26	November 2, 1976	A violet field charged with a white 6-petal flower with a yellow dot in its center.
	Mie	JP-24	April 20, 1964	A green field charged with a white み stylized into an arrow pointing up.
	Miyagi	JP-04	July 15, 1966	A green field charged with a white み stylized into a Lespedeza thunbergii (known locally as miyaginohagi (ミヤギノハギ)).
	Miyazaki	JP-45	December 22, 1964	A green field with a yellow ミ ("mi") stylized into three stairs.
	Nagano	JP-20	March 20, 1967	An orange field charged with a white disc consisting of a stylized katakana "ナ" (na).
	Nagasaki	JP-42	August 30, 1991	A white field charged with a light blue N stylized into the form of a dove.
	Nara	JP-29	March 1, 1968	A white field charged with a maroon ナ ("na") stylized as a circle.
	Niigata (detail)	JP-15	August 23, 1968	Red field charged with a gold stylized 新 ("nii") and Katakana characters ガタ ("gata").
	Ōita	JP-44	July 24, 1966	A white field charged with three red kanji 大 ("ō") stylized and arranged in a circle. The variant has the prefecture's full name in kanji at the bottom-hoist (left) corner.
	Okayama	JP-33	November 22, 1967	A dark purple field charged with a yellow 岡 ("oka") stylized as a circle.
	Okinawa (detail)	JP-47	October 13, 1972	A white field charged with a white O inside of a red disc.
	Ōsaka	JP-27	June 21, 1968	A blue field charged with three white letter "o"s connected via branches to another "o".
	Saga	JP-41	December 11, 1968	A green field charged with a white camphor flower.
	Saitama	JP-11	September 1, 1964	A white field charged with 16 red ornamental beads arranged in a circle. The 玉 ("tama") of "Saitama" means "bead".
	Shiga	JP-25	September 16, 1968	A light blue field charged with a white emblem consisting of シガ ("Shiga") stylized into a circle with wings.
	Shimane	JP-32	November 8, 1968	A dark red field charged with four yellow katakana マ (ma) circularly stylized and arranged into a cloud-shaped circle
	Shizuoka	JP-22	August 26, 1968	A blue field with an orange emblem consisting of a stylization of both the map of the prefecture and Mount Fuji. the emblem is thickly fimbriated with white.
	Tochigi	JP-09	March 1, 1964	A light green field charged with an emblem consisting of the kanji 栃 ("tochi"), heavily stylized. The top-left corner of the emblem is a white rectangle with three upward-pointing arrows, a stylization of the character 木 ("gi").
	Tokushima	JP-36	March 18, 1966	A blue field charged with a yellow emblem consisting of the hiragana とく ("toku") stylized into a flying bird. The variant has the prefecture's full name in kanji at the bottom-fly (right) corner.
	Tokyo (detail)	JP-13	October 1, 1964	A six-rayed stylised sun with a dot in the center. The background color is Edo purple (江戸紫, Edo murasaki), which was popular in Edo, the name of Tokyo during the Edo period. This shade of purple is one of the traditional colors of Japan, and is near-identical to Web Indigo.
	Tokyo (detail)	JP-13	September 30, 1989	A stylised green Ginkgo biloba leaf. The symbol consists of three arcs combined to resemble a leaf of the ginkgo, the metropolitan tree, and is reminiscent of a "T" for Tokyo. Created by Rei Yoshimura (レイ吉村), a professional graphic designer.
	Tottori	JP-31	October 23, 1968	A blue field charged with a white emblem consisting of the hiragana と ("to") stylized into a flying bird ("tori").
	Toyama	JP-16	December 27, 1988	A white field charged with a green emblem consisting of the hiragana と ("to") stylized together with Mount Tateyama.
	Wakayama	JP-30	August 7, 1969	A white field charged with a navy blue emblem, consisting of the katakana ワ ("wa") stylized into an open fan.
	Yamagata	JP-06	March 26, 1963	A blue field charged with three white mountain peaks (possibly stylizations of the kanji for mountain 山, "yama") with a triangular indentation on the bottom of each peak.
	Yamaguchi	JP-35	September 3, 1962	A brown field charged with the kanji 山口 ("Yamaguchi") stylized into a bird flying towards the sun.
	Yamanashi	JP-19	December 1, 1966	A magenta field charged with three orange stylized 人 combined to form a 山 ("yama") enclosed by a white trapezoid representing Mount Fuji.

== Symbol mark flag ==
Symbol mark flag of Kagoshima Prefecture

Symbol mark flag of Tokyo

== Historical flags ==
Toyama Prefecture (1957–1988)

Osaka Prefecture (1968–1984)

Kumamoto Prefecture (1960)

Yamagata Prefecture (1963–1971)

Fukushima Prefecture (1951–1968)

Ibaraki Prefecture (1966–1991)

Ehime Prefecture (1989–1999; logo retained as prefectural emblem)

Nagasaki Prefecture (1991, unofficial)

Okinawa Prefecture (24 April–15 May 1972)

Okinawa Prefecture (15 May–13 October 1972)

Karafuto Prefecture (1911–1949)

== See also ==
- Flag of Japan
- List of Japanese flags
- Prefectures of Japan
