= Flag of Hokkaido =

Japanese regional and prefectural flag

Hokkaido

The flag of Hokkaido (Japanese: 北海道旗, Hokkaido-ki) consists of a dark blue field charged with the emblem of Hokkaido.

The flag and emblem were adopted on May 1, 1967, and are derived from the flag of the Hokkaido Development Commission, which featured a red five-pointed star on a blue field.

== History ==
=== Hokkaido Development Commission ===
The Hokkaido Development Commission used a flag with a red five-pointed star on a blue background, which came to be known as the Hokushin Flag. This design was initially used as a flag on official ships of the commission by Suejiro Ebiko, who served as the captain of the commission's official ship. It was eventually adopted as the de facto emblem of the Development Commission, and was officially adopted in February 1872.

Flag of the Hokkaido Development Commission (1872-1882)

Kuroda Kiyotaka's rejected proposal for the flag of the Hokkaido Development Commission

In September 1872, Kuroda Kiyotaka, then Vice-Minister of Development, requested the government to change the design of the Hokushin flag from a red five-pointed star to a seven-pointed star but this proposal was rejected. Subsequently, in 1878, the Development Commission ceased flying the Hokushin flag, and it was abolished in 1882. During the period of the era of three prefectures and one bureau of Nemuro, Sapporo, and Hakodate, and the era of the former Hokkaido Government after these three prefectures were reintegrated, no specific flags or emblems were created.

=== Present design ===
Emblem of Hokkaido

In the 1960s, as other prefectures successively established their prefectural flags, there was growing momentum to establish a Hokkaido flag in anticipation of the 100th anniversary of the founding of Hokkaido in 1968. As part of the Hokkaido Centennial Project, several art organizations active within Hokkaido were commissioned to create designs. From over 7,500 submitted design proposals, the Hokkaido Flag and Hokkaido Emblem Establishment Committee selected a design. On March 31, 1967, they decided to adopt a proposal jointly developed by Kenichi Kuriyagawa and instructors from the Hokkaido Design Institute, which he represented. It was officially established on May 1 by Hokkaido Announcement No. 775, 'Hokkaido Emblem and Hokkaido Flag.' Additionally, in 1992, to clarify the identity of the Hokkaido Government Office, a logo mark for the government office featuring the emblem as a motif was established as the 'Hokkaido Government Basic Design.

== Design ==
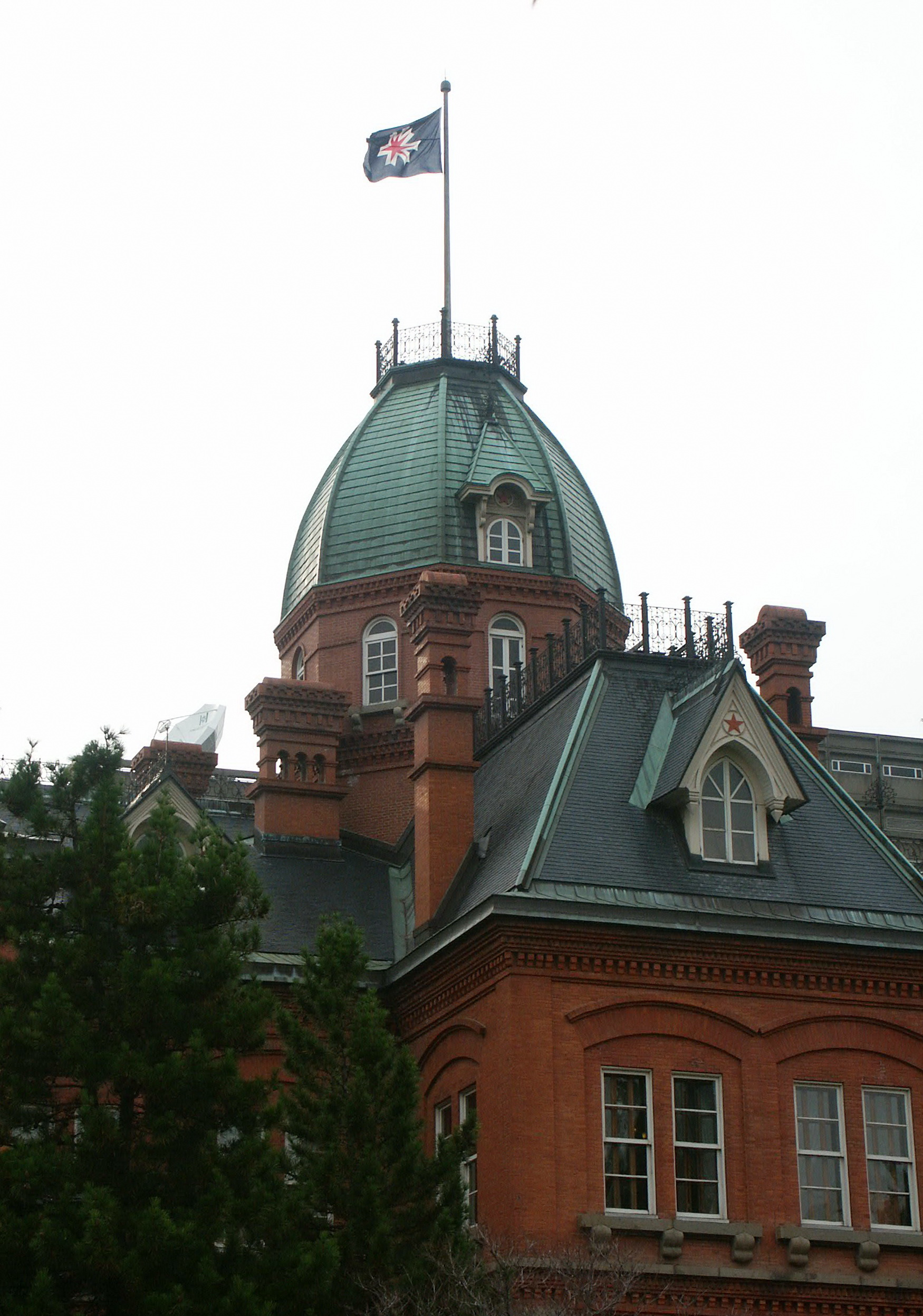
The flag of Hokkaido flown above the Former Hokkaido Government Office

The emblem of Hokkaido represents Hokkaido's pioneering spirit and the boldly growing future of Hokkaido by depicting the five-pointed star of the Hokushin flag as a modernized seven-pointed star. Unlike the Hokkaido flag, there are no specific colour regulations for the emblem.

The colours of the Hokkaido flag are based on the former Kuroda proposal, with navy blue representing the northern seas and sky as the background. The emblem placed in the center features a red seven-pointed star symbolizing the indomitable energy of Hokkaido residents, surrounded by white light representing brilliance and the snow and wind of the region.

In 1991, as part of improvements to visual information media design by the Hokkaido Government's “Friendly Design Review Committee,” the 'Hokkaido Government Basic Design' was established. Designed by Shin Ikeda, it features a blue emblem symbolizing Hokkaido flanked by two vertical green lines—thicker on the right and half the thickness on the left representing "the endlessly stretching road to the future." The overall mark forms the letter 'H,' representing Hokkaido, evoking an image full of rich potential and nature, and includes the word 'Hokkaido' in Gona font in the upper right corner.
