= Flag of Iwate Prefecture =

Japanese prefectural flag

Iwate Prefecture
- Use: State flag
- Proportion: 2:3
- Adopted: 6 March 1965
- Design: Stylized character 岩 (iwa) in white, centered on a grayish-blue background

The flag of Iwate Prefecture (Japanese: 岩手県旗, Hepburn: Iwate-ken ki) is the prefectural flag of Iwate Prefecture, Japan.

To commemorate the construction of the Iwate Prefectural Office, a public contest was held to create a new symbol for Iwate, and the crest was announced on 10 November 1964 under Prefectural Announcement No.1083 (告示第1083号, Kokuji Dai-sen-hachijū-san-gō). The symbol itself is a vertically symmetrical adaptation of the Chinese character 岩, pronounced iwa, as in Iwate.

The flag itself was instituted on 6 March 1965. It consists of a grayish blue background with the Iwate crest centered in white.
