= List of international prime ministerial trips made by Yousaf Raza Gillani =

The Prime Minister of Pakistan, Yusuf Raza Gilani made dozens of foreign trips during the tenure of Pakistan People's Party, from 2008-13. Here is the list of foreign diplomatic visits made by these two Prime Ministers.

*Foreign visits (especially private visits) which don't include any considerable engagement are excluded from this list.

== Yusuf Raza Gillani ==
Prime Minister: 25 March, 2008 - 19 June, 2012

=== 2008 ===
Country	Date/s	Engagements	Ref.
Egypt	17-20 May	Attended "World Economic Forum Conference". Met with President Bush and Hosni Mubarak.	
Saudi Arabia	6-8 June	Met with King Abdullah.	
Malaysia	7-9 July	Attended "D-8 Summit". Met with PM of Malaysia Abdullah Ahmad Badawi.	
USA	27-30 July	Held meeting with President George W. Bush.	
Sri Lanka	1-3 August	Attended "15th SAARC Summit". Met with Indian PM Manmohan Singh.	
China	7-8 August	Attended "2008 Summer Olympics opening ceremony". Met with President Hu Jintao.	
China	23-25 October	Attended "7th ASEM Summit". Met with PM Manmohan Singh.	

=== 2009 ===
Country	Date/s	Engagements	Ref.
Switzerland	28 January - 1 February	Attended "World Economic Forum Conference".	
Egypt	14-16 July	Attended "15th NAM Summit". Met with PM Manmohan Singh.	
Libya	31 August - 2 September	Attended "40th anniversary of 1969 Libyan revolution". Met with Muammar Gaddafi.	
China	12-16 October	Met with President Hu Jintao.	
Germany	30 November - 1 December	Met with German Chancellor Angela Merkel.	
UK	2-3 December	Met with British PM Gordon Brown.	

=== 2010 ===
Country	Date/s	Engagements	Ref.
USA	11-13 April	Attended "2010 Nuclear Security Summit". Met with President Obama.	
Nepal	26-27 April	Met with Prime Minister Madhav Kumar Nepal.	
Bhutan	27-29 April	Attended "SAARC Summit". Met with PM of Bhutan Jigme Thinley.	
Tajikistan	24-25 November	Attended "9th SCO Head of Government Summit". Met with Prime Minister Putin.	
Afghanistan	4-5 December	Met with President Hamid Karzai.	
Turkey	6-8 December	Met with Prime Minister Recep Tayyip Erdoğan.	
Oman	27-28 December	Met with Sultan of Oman Qaboos bin Said.	

=== 2011 ===
Country	Date/s	Engagements	Ref.
Kuwait	14-15 February	Met with Emir of Kuwait Sabah Al-Ahmad.	
Kyrgyzstan	15-16 March	Met with Prime Minister Almazbek Atambayev	
Uzbekistan	24-25 March	Met with Prime Minister Shavkat Mirziyoyev.	
India	30 March	Met with PM Manmohan Singh and INC President Sonia Gandhi. Witnessed 2011 Cricket World Cup Semi Final 2 in Mohali.	
Afghanistan	16 April	Met with President Hamid Karzai.	
France	3-6 May	Met with President Nicolas Sarkozy.	
China	17-20 May	Met with President Hu Jintao and Premier Wen Jiabao.	
Saudi Arabia	7-8 August	Met with King Abdullah.	
Kazakhstan	6-7 September	Met with President Nursultan Nazarbayev.	

=== 2012 ===
Country	Date/s	Engagements	Ref.
Qatar	6-8 February	Met with Emir of Qatar Hamad bin Khalifa and PM Hamad bin Jassim.	
UK	8-12 May	Attended 1st Pak-UK summit level review of enhanced strategic dialogue. Met with PM Cameron.	

== See also ==
Foreign relations of Pakistan
