= Nuclear Security Summit =

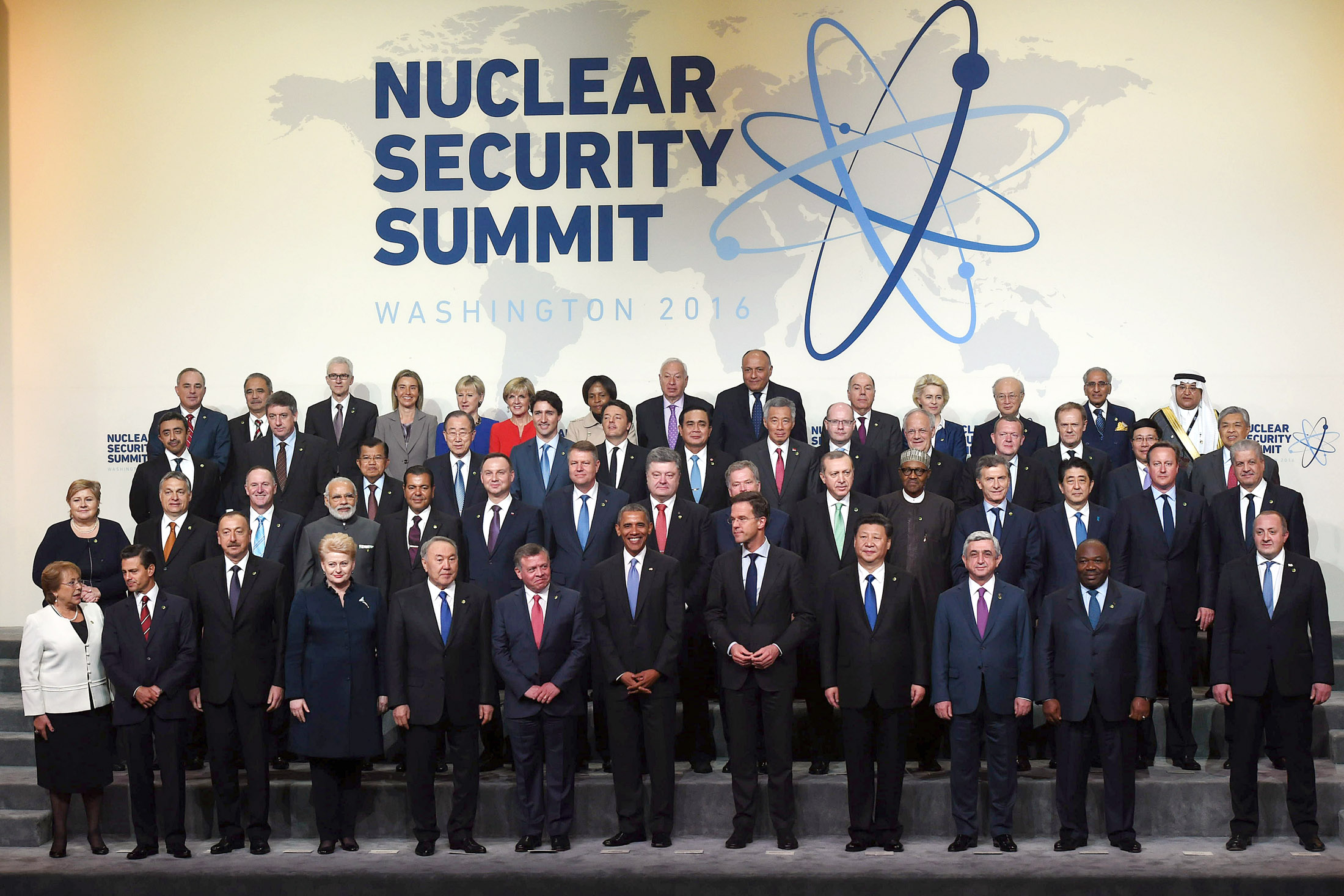
World leaders at the Nuclear Security Summit 2016 in Washington, DC.

The Nuclear Security Summit (NSS) was a semi-annual world summit, aimed at preventing nuclear terrorism around the globe. The first summit was held in Washington, D.C., United States, on April 12–13, 2010. The second summit was held in Seoul, South Korea, in 2012. The third summit was held in The Hague, Netherlands, on March 24–25, 2014. The fourth and final summit was held in Washington, D.C., on March 31–April 1, 2016.

== History ==
Date	Country	City	Host leader
April 12–13, 2010	United States	Washington, D.C.	Barack Obama
March 26–27, 2012	South Korea	Seoul	Lee Myung-bak
March 24–25, 2014	Netherlands	The Hague	Mark Rutte
March 31–April 1, 2016	United States	Washington, D.C.	Barack Obama

== Background ==
In 2009, U.S. President Obama delivered a speech in Prague in which he called nuclear terrorism one of the greatest threats to international security. With that in mind, Obama hosted the first Nuclear Security Summit (NSS) in Washington, D.C., in 2010, in order to draw attention, at the highest possible level, to the need to secure nuclear material and thus prevent nuclear terrorism. Forty-seven countries and three international organisations participated in the first summit. In 2012 the second NSS was held in Seoul. Fifty-three countries and four international organisations were invited. The first summit was concerned with making political agreements, while the follow-up in Seoul focused on the progress made on implementing those agreements. The third NSS, in The Hague in 2014, centred on the results achieved and the future.

Under the NSS process, countries worked to improve their nuclear security on the basis of the Washington Work Plan, which contained numerous measures and action points. In Seoul a number of additional action points were formulated and set down in the Seoul Communiqué. The NSS process was ongoing, and since 2009 has required world leaders and diplomats to devote extra attention to the issue of nuclear security. Extensive consultations were held in the run-up to every summit. For NSS 2014 this process started in 2012. The negotiators for the various countries, known as sherpas and sous sherpas, discussed the progress made and conferred on key themes, work plans and measures. Ultimately, these negotiations lead to decisions, which were later affirmed at the summit and published in a communiqué.

== NSS 2010 ==
Forty-seven countries and three international organizations participated in the first Nuclear Security Summit, held in Washington in 2010 at the initiative of President Obama. The aim of the summit was to improve worldwide nuclear security by enhancing cooperation and to make concrete agreements aimed at better securing nuclear materials and facilities. The results of the summit were set down in the Washington Work Plan in the form of concrete plans and action points, and the Washington Communiqué, which contains commitments and declarations of intent from the participating countries.

The commitments made in Washington in 2010 are:

- Leaders jointly affirmed the seriousness and urgency of the threat posed by nuclear terrorism.
- The participating countries agreed to work to secure all vulnerable nuclear material worldwide.
- The participating countries agreed to shoulder their responsibility for securing nuclear material within their own borders.
- The participating countries agreed to work together as an international community to improve nuclear security.

== NSS 2012 ==
Following the summit in Washington in 2010 six new countries (Azerbaijan, Denmark, Gabon, Hungary, Lithuania and Romania) and one new international organisation (Interpol) were invited by South Korea to join the NSS. Fifty-three countries attended the second summit in Seoul in 2012, which built on the goals that had been identified in Washington. New ambitions were added to the Washington Work Plan: the participants recognised the need to increase synergy between nuclear safety and security and better protect radiological sources from theft and misuse. Radiological sources may not be usable for a nuclear weapon, but they are well suited for making a ‘dirty bomb’, which can release radiation and cause social upheaval.

The concrete results of the summit were presented in the Seoul Communiqué.

== NSS 2014 ==
The 2014 summit in March 2014 in The Hague, the Netherlands, charted the accomplishments of the past two years, identifying which of the objectives set out in the Washington Work Plan and the Seoul Communiqué have not been met and proposing ways to achieve them.

The intention of the host country was to focus on the following achievable and visible goals:

1. Optimal security for and, if at all possible, a reduction in the use of highly enriched uranium and plutonium.
2. Ratification of the amended Convention on the Physical Protection of Nuclear Material by more countries to ensure that the amendment enters into force as soon as possible.
3. More frequent reviews of state security structures by IAEA advisory missions.
4. National registration and protection of highly radioactive sources (e.g. medical equipment).
5. Greater role for industry in nuclear security, to enhance the security culture and existing regulations.
6. States should provide information to their own people and the international community to demonstrate that they are taking appropriate measures to maintain the security of their nuclear material and facilities. These confidence-building measures will increase trust in the international protection system.

== NSS 2016 ==
The fourth NSS took place in Washington, D.C., on April 1, 2016.

Leaders in attendance included British Prime Minister David Cameron, Canadian Prime Minister Justin Trudeau, French President François Hollande, Italian Prime Minister Matteo Renzi, Argentine President Mauricio Macri, Mexican President Enrique Peña Nieto, Chinese Paramount leader Xi Jinping, Kazakhstan's President Nursultan Nazarbayev, Japanese Prime Minister Shinzo Abe, South Korean President Park Geun-hye, Indian Prime Minister Narendra Modi and Viet Nam's Prime Minister Nguyen Tan Dung.

Russia informed Washington in mid-October it will not attend the summit. Their Foreign Ministry stated, "We shared with our American colleagues our doubts regarding the added value of a forum that is planned to be held in the United States in 2016," "We believe it is unacceptable to create a precedent of such outside interference into the work of international organizations," and "Washington is trying to assume the role of the main and privileged 'player' in this field," the foreign ministry said, adding that Russia would instead focus on its cooperation with the International Atomic Energy Agency." Kazakhstan's President Nursultan Nazarbayev unveiled on the sidelines of NSS 2016 a policy framework to end the threat of nuclear war titled Manifesto: The World 21st Century.

=== Atoms for Peace Award Given to Turkey at Nuclear Summit in Washington ===
Turkey’s award was received by Energy and Natural Resources Minister Berat Albayrak, who received the award from Susan Eisenhower, the President of the international consultancy firm The Eisenhower Group.

== Gift baskets ==
Certain countries involved in the NSS are interested in taking a specific security theme a step further. These countries are being given the opportunity to offer a ‘gift basket’, an extra initiative. The idea is for presenters of such gift baskets to acquire the backing of as many countries as possible, which will in turn function as role models for a given aspect of security. The United States first implemented a policy of Gift Basket Diplomacy between the 2010 and 2012 Summits.
