= Nuclear fuel bank =

Reserve of low enriched uranium reactor fuel

A nuclear fuel bank is reserve of low enriched uranium (LEU) for countries that need a backup source of LEU to fuel their nuclear reactors. Countries that do have enrichment technology would donate enriched fuel to a "bank", from which countries not possessing enrichment technology would obtain fuel for their power reactors.

LEU banks are meant to be nuclear fuel providers "in the event of unforeseen, non-commercial disruption" to the supplies, and are regarded an important international effort to "prevent nuclear proliferation and dissuading countries from building uranium enrichment facilities by guaranteeing access to LEU for fuel use should other sources fail."

The concept of providing an assured supply of nuclear fuel, and thus avoiding the need for countries to build indigenous nuclear fuel production capabilities, has long been proposed as a way to curb the proliferation of nuclear weapons and, eventually, eliminate them altogether. Austria, Russia, the European Union, the United States, and others have supported various concepts of an international fuel bank. Many non-nuclear-weapon states have been reluctant to embrace any of these proposals for varying reasons.

== Overview ==
Enrichment technology is primarily used to create enriched nuclear fuel, but it can also be used to create weapons-grade nuclear material. The main goal of a fuel bank is therefore to minimize the risk of further nuclear weapons proliferation by removing the need for countries to possess enrichment technology.

The proposed fuel bank would assure a back-up supply for power reactors throughout the world on a non-discriminatory, non-political basis, reducing the need for countries to develop their own uranium enrichment technologies which could also be used for nuclear weapons development. The IAEA's former Director General Dr. ElBaradei confirmed this, saying that the importance of nuclear fuel banks is "by providing reliable access to fuel at competitive market prices, we remove the need for countries to develop indigenous fuel cycle capabilities. In so doing, we could go a long way towards addressing current concerns about the dissemination of sensitive fuel cycle technologies."

=== Advocates ===
Dr. ElBaradei, who was director of the International Atomic Energy Agency from 1997 to 2009, called for the establishment of a nuclear fuel bank to provide peaceful access to nuclear energy without raising questions about dual-use technology. "Every country that would like to get the fuel, that would like to get the technology, the reactor, will get that, but not necessarily developing their own enrichment facility. And assurance of supply mechanism should be reliable, should be apolitical, should be based solely on non-proliferation criteria," he said. In his acceptance of the 2005 Nobel Peace Prize, Dr. ElBaradei also said the establishment of an international fuel bank would remove the incentive for each country to develop its own fuel cycle. "We should then be able to agree on a moratorium on new national facilities, and to begin work on multinational arrangements for enrichment, fuel production, waste disposal and reprocessing," he said.

Joseph Cirincione, the director of the nonproliferation program at the Carnegie Endowment for International Peace, said in 2006 that an international fuel bank could start reforms at the international level. "If we handle it properly, Iran might be the trigger for resolving this problem that troubles all nations relying on nuclear power. Iran, ironically, could be the catalyst for creating a fundamentally new system of how we produce and sell nuclear fuel," he said. The Iran nuclear deal framework of 2015 did not include the idea of a fuel bank.

U.S. Senators Richard Lugar and Evan Bayh, both of Indiana, have also advocated for a nuclear fuel bank. In an op-ed published in the Chicago Tribune, they wrote that what is needed is "a new international non-proliferation standard that prevents countries from using the guise of nuclear energy to develop nuclear weapons". Lugar and Bayh argued this was imperative because "the coming surge in demand for nuclear power will lead more and more nations to seek their own enrichment facilities", and jointly called for the establishment of an International Nuclear Fuel Bank, controlled by the International Atomic Energy Agency. In 2009, the formation of a nuclear fuel bank was endorsed by U.S. President Barack Obama in a speech in Prague: "And we should build a new framework for civil nuclear cooperation, including an International Fuel Bank, so that countries can access peaceful power without increasing the risk of proliferation. That must be the right of every national that renounces nuclear weapons, especially for developing countries embarking on peaceful programs."

On 29/08/2017, An International Atomic Energy Agency (IAEA) project aimed at providing confidence to countries about the availability of nuclear power fuel reached a key milestone on Tuesday towards its establishment, with the inauguration in Kazakhstan of a facility where low-enriched uranium (LEU) will be stored.

=== Controversy ===
Developing nations, including a number in the Non-Aligned Movement, have expressed reservations about mechanisms for assurance of supply and have been critical of additional criteria for accessing the fuel banks.

Some reasons that non-nuclear weapon states have been reluctant to embrace these proposals include:

- a perception that the commercial or strategic interests of nuclear weapon states motivated the proposals
- a perception that the proposals produce a dependency on a limited number of nuclear fuel suppliers
- a perception that the proposal restricts their unalienable right to nuclear energy for peaceful purposes.

One example of such a feared political-cutoff came after the 1979 Iranian Revolution. Germany halted construction of the Iranian Bushehr reactor, the United States cut off the supply of highly enriched fuel for the Tehran Research Reactor, and Iran never received uranium from France which it asserted it was entitled to. Russia also agreed not to provide an enrichment plant and terminated cooperation on several other nuclear-related technologies, including laser isotope separation. China terminated several nuclear projects in return in part for entry into force of a U.S.-China civil nuclear cooperation agreement. Ukraine agreed not to provide the turbine for the Bushehr reactor. These combined experiences contributed to an Iranian belief that foreign nuclear supplies are potentially subject to being interrupted. An international nuclear fuel bank would have to overcome this perception.

== History ==
=== 1940–1969 ===
The Report on the International Control of Atomic Energy, commonly known as the Acheson–Lilienthal Report, was written by a United States committee in 1946 and discussed possible methods for the international control of nuclear weapons and the avoidance of future nuclear warfare. The report was produced by the Committee on Atomic Energy, headed by Dean Acheson and David Lilienthal, and was mostly written by scientist Robert Oppenheimer. The report recommended that an international body, such as the United Nations, have control over both atomic materials and the means of producing nuclear energy. Bruno Pellaud, the IAEA's former deputy director-general for safeguards, says the fuel bank idea was developed as far back as 1957.

The resulting Baruch Plan was a 1946 proposal by the United States government, written largely by political consultant Bernard Baruch. It was presented to the United Nations Atomic Energy Commission (UNAEC) at its first meeting in June 1946. The plan proposed to:

1. extend between all nations the exchange of basic scientific information for peaceful ends;
2. implement control of atomic energy to the extent necessary to ensure its use only for peaceful purposes;
3. eliminate from national armaments both atomic weapons and all other major weapons adaptable to mass destruction; and
4. establish effective safeguards, by way of inspection and other means, to protect complying States against the hazards of violations and evasions

The plan clearly announced that the United States would maintain its nuclear weapons monopoly until every aspect of the proposal was in effect. The Soviets subsequently rejected the Baruch Plan, and the United States then rejected a Soviet counter-proposal for a ban on all nuclear weapons.

In 1953, the U.S. proposed its Atoms for Peace plan. In a speech to the UN General Assembly in New York City on December 8, 1953, U.S. President Dwight D. Eisenhower called on the United States with the Soviet Union "to make joint contributions from their stockpiles of normal uranium and fissionable materials to an international Atomic Energy Agency" that would then "devise methods whereby this fissionable material would be allocated to serve the peaceful pursuits of mankind." The plan also proposed a new International Atomic Energy Agency and “uranium bank” as simple steps to establish international trust and start a cooperative arms control dialogue.

On July 29, 1957, the International Atomic Energy Agency (IAEA) was established. However, the concept that the IAEA would serve as a bank of nuclear materials, drawing down US and Soviet stocks below the level where either could launch a knock-out blow against the other, languished. During this period the U.S. Congress preferred to supply nuclear material directly to foreign partners in bilateral agreements, thus bypassing the IAEA and applying U.S. safeguards to the transaction instead. It became clear that having the IAEA serve as a nuclear material bank had not succeeded in the Cold War.

=== 1970–1989 ===
Through the 1970s and 1980s, further options were examined for developing a "proliferation-resistant" fuel cycle. The managerial aspects of the nuclear fuel cycle were also explored during this time and a number of unsuccessful proposals were advanced. Some of the proposals included initiatives on:

- Technical or physical modification of the fuel cycle to restrict access to sensitive nuclear materials
- Multilateral fuel cycle centers for a small number of States to pool their resources in to a single centre
- Multinational spent fuel centers as a way to handle separated plutonium;
- An international nuclear fuel authority to guarantee nuclear fuel to Non-Nuclear Weapon States which renounced national reprocessing or enrichment plants
- International plutonium storage to help implement Article XII. A.5 of the IAEA Statute

In the late 1970s, the International Nuclear Fuel Cycle Evaluation conducted a study into the management of spent nuclear fuel. The IAEA's "Working Group 6" issued a report on spent fuel management which identified interim storage of spent fuel as an important step in the nuclear fuel cycle. An earlier IAEA study on Regional Fuel Cycle Centre from 1977 has also pointed out the importance of spent fuel. The fuel cycle evaluation was formally launched in October 1977 by the Carter Administration, with more than 500 experts from 46 nations participating.

The IAEA Board of Governors subsequently established the Committee on Assurances of Supply (CAS) in 1980 to address similar concerns. The Committee examined the issue of multinationalization of the fuel cycle, but was unable to reach a consensus and went into formal abeyance in 1987.

=== IAEA Expert Group ===
Former IAEA Director General Dr. ElBaradei gave an international expert group the task of coming up with possible multilateral approaches to better control the sensitive parts of the nuclear fuel cycle. Dr. ElBaradei said that in recent years the nuclear non-proliferation regime has been under tremendous stress and noted the key is fairness and recognizing the interests of all parties. He also said that a lack of progress in confronting the growing risk of nuclear proliferation "could lead to self-destruction".

The group made the following recommendations to strengthen controls over fuel enrichment, reprocessing of fuel, spent fuel repositories and spent fuel storage. They were:

1. Reinforcing existing commercial market mechanisms on a case-by-case basis
2. Developing and implementing international supply guarantees with IAEA participation
3. Promoting voluntary conversion of existing facilities to multilateral nuclear approaches
4. Creating, through voluntary agreements and contracts, multinational, and in particular regional, MNAs for new facilities
5. The scenario of a further expansion of nuclear energy around the world might call for the development of a nuclear fuel cycle with stronger multilateral arrangements

The Expert Group included representatives from 26 countries. Bruno Pellaud, the Group's Chairman and former Head of IAEA Safeguards, said “a joint nuclear facility with multinational staff puts all participants under a greater scrutiny from peers and partners, a fact that strengthens non-proliferation and security…Moreover, they have the potential to facilitate the continued use of nuclear energy for peaceful purposes."

=== Fuel banks and International Enrichment Center ===
As of March 2011 the IAEA Board of Governors has approved the creation of two separate fuel banks. The first, formally established by the IAEA and the Russian government in March 2010, is owned, operated, and paid for by the Russian Federation and located near the Siberian city of Angarsk. The reserve has been fully stocked and became operational on 1 December 2010. The Board of Governors approved a second fuel reserve in December 2010, which will be owned and operated by the IAEA itself, but this fuel bank is not yet operational. Kazakhstan has offered to host a nuclear fuel bank under IAEA auspices as a way to curb nuclear proliferation. In May 2015, the IAEA approved a Host-State Agreement with Kazakhstan, paving the way for Kazakhstan to host the LEU Bank. The plans call for having Russia enrich the uranium before it is stored.

Kazatomprom proposed at the 2013 IAEA General Conference that Kazakhstan host the LEU bank at its Ulba Metallurgical Plant. Kazakhstan's Foreign Minister Erlan Idrissov said in an interview that the bank posed no environment threats and highlights Kazakhstan's contribution into the global efforts of nonproliferation and peaceful use of nuclear power. The LEU bank is under construction in Ust-Kamenogorsk, Kazakhstan under the aegis of the IAEA.

In addition to the two fuel banks, the Russian Federation has also established an International Uranium Enrichment Center (IUEC) located at Angarsk. The IUEC is set up as a joint stock company between Russia's Rosatom Corporation holding 80% of the shares, Kazakhstani and Ukrainian corporations, while the government of Armenia slated to join the company in the future. The IUEC differs from the two fuel banks in several important ways. First, it is a for-profit entity owned by state-backed companies. As a result, unlike the fuel banks, it is preferential and exclusive in its provision of enrichment services. The IUEC gives preferential treatment to its shareholders when selling enrichment services, and is only available to states that do not have domestic enrichment capabilities and perform their obligations under the Nuclear Non-Proliferation Treaty. Like the fuel banks, it provides an alternative to the expensive start-up costs of an indigenous enrichment capacity, but unlike the fuel banks it provides a further financial incentive to its shareholders in the form of dividends.

== Proposals ==
A fuel bank would act as a back-up supply for nuclear power reactors throughout the world on a non-discriminatory and apolitical basis, reducing the need for countries to develop their own uranium enrichment technologies at a time when concerns about nuclear proliferation are growing. Government and industry experts agree the fuel market functions well in meeting current demand, and a fuel bank would be designed inherently in a way not to disrupt the existing commercial market in nuclear fuels. Mohamed ElBaradei, director general of the IAEA from 1997 to 2009, has also suggested that no State should be required to give up its rights under the Non-Proliferation Treaty regarding any parts of the nuclear fuel cycle.

In March 2008, an IAEA magazine outlined 12 proposals for a multilateral approach that had been put forward. The proposals ranged from providing backup assurances of supply to establishing an IAEA-controlled low-enriched uranium reserve or setting up international enrichment centers.

In May 2009, three proposals were recommended as the form an international fuel bank should take. Two proposals were for Russian and IAEA fuel banks to provide supply of last resort and were initially proposed by Dr. ElBaradei in 2003. Germany put forward a complementary proposal which advocated the creation of an internationally governed nuclear fuel production plant where production would be done in an extraterritorial site inside an unspecified country.

Over 60 states, many of them developing nations, have informed the International Atomic Energy Agency that they have an interest in launching nuclear energy programs. However, some of these states have expressed concerns that they would lose all access to enrichment and reprocessing technology if they were to accept fuel from a fuel bank.

=== Kazakhstani Proposal ===
Kazakhstan offered the Ulba Metallurgical Plant as a site for an IAEA administered fuel bank. The IAEA Board of Governors approved the plan to set up the fuel bank in December 2010, but made no choice of the site at that time. The topic of a nuclear fuel bank was briefly mentioned by some members attending the Nuclear Security Summit (2010), a summit being held in Washington, D.C. in April 2010 focusing on how to better safeguard weapons-grade plutonium and uranium to prevent nuclear terrorism. Robert J. Einhorn, Special US Advisor on Non-Proliferation and Arms Control, said the Obama Administration has supported international fuel banks but that "this issue will come up at the May NPT Review Conference, but this is not the focus of" the Nuclear Security Summit. Despite the focus on nuclear terrorism, Kazakhstan's president Nursultan Nazarbayev sought the U.S.'s backing to house a nuclear fuel bank while he was in Washington for the event and Prime Minister of Pakistan Yousaf Raza Gillani issued a statement saying Pakistan would like to act as a provider and "participate in any non-discriminatory nuclear fuel cycle assurance mechanism". The UAE also reconfirmed its $10 million pledge to the IAEA Nuclear Fuel Bank and its policy of foregoing domestic enrichment and spent fuel reprocessing.

In May 2015, the IAEA approved a Host-State Agreement, paving the way for Kazakhstan to host the LEU Bank.

=== German proposal ===
Germany has proposed the creation of a multilateral uranium enrichment center with extraterritorial status, which would operate on a commercial basis as a new supplier in the market. The center would operate under Agency control and providing enrichment services to its customer. Customers could then obtain nuclear fuel for civilian use under strict supervision. Germany has also proposed a “Multilateral Enrichment Sanctuary Project” for an international enrichment center by a group of interested States, on an extraterritorial basis in a host State.

=== NTI funding proposal ===
The Washington-based Nuclear Threat Initiative's proposal for an international fuel bank announced an initial $50 million grant to the IAEA contingent upon an additional $100 million from other sources. The United States has offered $50 million, the United Arab Emirates has pledged $10 million, Norway has promised $5 million and the European Union agreed to provide up to 25 million euros (about $32 million in May 2009). The fuel bank therefore reached its initial funding target in March 2009.

Former Senator Sam Nunn, a co-chairman of the Nuclear Threat Initiative, said in a speech announcing the NTI pledge that "we envision that this stockpile will be available as a last-resort fuel reserve for nations that have made the sovereign choice to develop their nuclear energy based on foreign sources of fuel supply services-and therefore have no indigenous enrichment facilities." Warren Buffett, a key NTI advisor, is financially backing and enabling the commitment. "This pledge is an investment in a safer world," Buffett said.

Countries that already enrich uranium favor the fuel bank because it keeps competitors from entering the market. Some emerging-market countries on the International Atomic Energy Agency Board of Governors have resisted the proposal. “It simply seems a real battlefield,” Iran's IAEA ambassador, Aliasghar Soltanieh, said. “It’s an issue of trust, and there’s been a lot of fraying of relationships between IAEA states,” said Curtis, Deputy Secretary of Energy under President Bill Clinton. "We think that (Kazakh President) Nursultan Nazarbayev's idea to host a nuclear fuel bank is a very good proposal," Iranian President Mahmoud Ahmadinejad has said. Iran has said it may stop sensitive uranium enrichment if guaranteed a supply of nuclear fuel from abroad, but has also insisted on its right to master the complete nuclear fuel cycle for what it says are peaceful purposes. Mahmoud Ahmadinejad has said Tehran places importance on international nuclear cooperation, including "Iran's presence in the global fuel bank." Iran has resisted sending its low-enriched uranium abroad and has proposed the IAEA supervise uranium enrichment inside the country.

=== Russian proposal ===
Sergey Kiriyenko, head of Russian nuclear corporation Rosatom, has told the IAEA General Conference that Russia planned to put under IAEA control a reserve of $300 million worth of low enriched uranium. The fuel would be stored at a multinational uranium-enrichment facility in the Siberian city of Angarsk and would be sufficient for two reactor-loads of low-enriched uranium. “We should carry out the preparatory work required for the IAEA Director-General to propose to the IAEA Board of Governors that they consider Russia’s plans for establishing guaranteed nuclear fuel reserves in the first half of 2008,” Kiriyenko said. He further said that Russia is ready to process 4,000 tons of Australian uranium a year.

Russia established its International Uranium Enrichment Center (IUEC) at the Angarsk Electrolysis Chemical Combine “to provide guaranteed access to uranium enrichment capabilities to the Centre’s participating organizations”. On 10 May 2007 the first agreement in the framework of the IUEC was signed by the Russian Federation and the Republic of Kazakhstan. In November 2009, the IAEA Board of Governors approved the Russian proposal to set up a low enriched uranium reserve available to Member States upon request from the Agency. Russia and the IAEA agreed on March 30, 2010, to set up the world's first nuclear fuel bank, at Angarsk in Siberia.

=== Six-Country Concept ===
The "Six-Country Concept" was proposed by France, Germany, the Netherlands, Russia, the UK, and the U.S. to provide reliable access to nuclear fuel. In 2008, all six of these nations had enrichment facilities. The proposal would require customer states to forego sensitive indigenous nuclear facilities, and if a supply disruption were to occur the recipient country would be able to approach the IAEA to facilitate new arrangements with other suppliers as long as nonproliferation conditions had been met – these conditions would include implementation of the Additional Protocol and safety and protection standards being satisfied.

The six nations proposed two levels of enrichment assurance beyond the normal market. At the “basic assurances” level, suppliers would agree to substitute for each other to cover certain supply interruptions to customers. At the “reserves” assurance level, participating governments could provide physical or virtual reserves of low-enriched uranium that would be made available if the “basic assurances” were not met.

=== Other proposals ===
Other proposals for a nuclear fuel bank have included:

- U.S. – "Reserve of nuclear fuel", September 2005
- Russia – "Statement on the Peaceful Use of Nuclear Energy", February 2006
- U.S. – "Global Nuclear Energy Partnership", February 2006
- World Nuclear Association, "Ensuring Security of Supply in the International Fuel Cycle", 2006
- Japan – "IAEA Standby Arrangements System for the Assurance of Nuclear Fuel Supply", September 2006
- UK – "Enrichment Bonds", June 2007
- European Union – "Nuclear Fuel Cycle", June 2007

== Low Enriched Uranium Bank in Kazakhstan ==
On August 27, 2015, an agreement to locate the IAEA LEU Bank in Kazakhstan was signed in the country's capital Astana. The bank was inaugurated on August 29, 2017, and is located at Ulba Metallurgical Plant. It is a physical reserve of up to 90 metric tons of LEU, sufficient to run a 1,000 MWe light-water reactor. Such a reactor can power a large city for three years. The facility was wholly funded by IAEA member states and other contributions for a total of $150 million. This is expected to cover costs for 20 years.

In October 2019, the Ulba bank received its first shipment of 32 canisters of LEU fuel.

== See also ==
- Global Nuclear Energy Partnership
- Nuclear proliferation
- Nuclear reactor technology
- Nuclear renaissance
