= Constance Holden =

American science journalist

Constance "Tancy" Holden (October 11, 1941 – April 12, 2010) was an American science journalist, known for her reporting on the roles of genetics and biology in human behavior. She worked at Science from 1970 until her death in 2010. She was also a successful artist whose oil paintings were hung on the walls of the American Association for the Advancement of Science's headquarters in Washington, D.C. On April 12, 2010, while riding her bicycle home from work, she was hit and killed by a truck providing security support for that day's Nuclear Security Summit. In her memory, the International Society for Intelligence Research awards a single individual the right to give the Constance Holden Memorial Address. Past recipients of this honor include Toby Young, Alice Dreger, and Susan Pinker. Her family also created the Constance Holden Memorial Concert in memory of her life in Vermont. The concert is performed annually by the classical music school Point Counterpoint, located on Lake Dunmore.
