= Global Initiative to Combat Nuclear Terrorism =

Intergovernmental organization

The Global Initiative to Combat Nuclear Terrorism (GICNT) is an international organization consisting of 89 countries that have endorsed a set of nuclear security principles for nuclear terrorism deterrence, prevention, detection, and response. It is co-chaired by the United States and Russia. The organization aims to develop partnership capacity to combat nuclear terrorism, consistent with national legal authorities and obligations as well as relevant international legal frameworks such as the Convention for the Suppression of Acts of Nuclear Terrorism, the Convention on the Physical Protection of Nuclear Material, and United Nations Security Council Resolutions 1373 and 1540.

== Overview ==
On July 16, 2006, Presidents George W. Bush and Vladimir Putin jointly announced the organization of the Global Initiative to Combat Nuclear Terrorism (GICNT). The GICNT is a voluntary initiative aimed at fostering international cooperation in order to prevent terrorists from acquiring, transporting, or using nuclear materials or radioactive substances, deter hostile actions against nuclear facilities, and respond to incidents involving the use of radiological or nuclear materials. GICNT participants work to unite experience and expertise from the nonproliferation, counter-proliferation, and counter-terrorism fields; strengthen global activities and institutions through the integration of collective capabilities and resources; and maintain a network for partners to share information and expertise in a legally non-binding capacity.

The founding 13 nations gathered in Rabat, Morocco, on October 30–31, 2006, for the first Plenary Meeting and agreed to a framework for the partnership, and a system for organizing events and charting nation progress. The Statement of Principles was the final product that guides GICNT efforts. Any country may choose to officially endorse in order to become a partner of the GICNT.

On April 5, 2009, President Barack Obama in his Prague Speech called for making the GICNT a "durable international institution." The historic 2010 Nuclear Security Summit, which President Obama initiated and hosted, highlighted the contributions of the GICNT to international efforts to combat nuclear terrorism.

The June 29, 2010, Plenary Meeting in Abu Dhabi, United Arab Emirates, resulted in several changes to the GICNT. The partnership adopted a revised Terms of Reference, activated an Implementation and Assessment Group (IAG), selected Spain as the Coordinator for the IAG, and selected the U.S. and Russia to continue serving as the Co-Chairs.

During the May 24, 2013, Plenary Meeting in Mexico City, Mexico, the partnership endorsed the Republic of Korea as the IAG Coordinator for a two-year term. During the June 17, 2015, Plenary Meeting in Helsinki, Finland, the partnership endorsed the Netherlands as the IAG Coordinator for a two-year term.

During the June 5, 2019, Plenary Meeting in Buenos Aires, Argentina the GICNT welcomed the United Nations Office of Counter-Terrorism (UNOCT) as an Official Observer organization. The partnership also endorsed the Kingdom of Morocco as the IAG Coordinator for the term 2019–2021.

== Statement of Principles ==
- Develop, if necessary, and improve accounting, control, and physical protection systems for nuclear and other radioactive materials and substances.
- Enhance security of civilian nuclear facilities.
- Improve the ability to detect nuclear and other radioactive materials and substances in order to prevent illicit trafficking in such materials and substances, to include cooperation in the research and development of national detection capabilities that would be interoperable.
- Improve capabilities of participants to search for, confiscate, and establish safe control over unlawfully held nuclear or other radioactive materials and substances or devices using them.
- Prevent the provision of safe haven to terrorists and financial or economic resources to terrorists seeking to acquire or use nuclear and other radioactive materials and substances.
- Ensure adequate respective national legal and regulatory frameworks sufficient to provide for the implementation of appropriate criminal and, if applicable, civil liability for terrorists and those who facilitate acts of nuclear terrorism.
- Improve capabilities of participants for response, mitigation, and investigation, in cases of terrorist attacks involving the use of nuclear and other radioactive materials and substances, including the development of technical means to identify nuclear and other radioactive materials and substances that are, or maybe, involved in the incident.
- Promote information sharing pertaining to the suppression of acts of nuclear terrorism and their facilitation, taking appropriate measures consistent with their national law and international obligations to protect the confidentiality of any information which they exchange in confidence.

== Partner nations ==
1. Afghanistan
2. Albania
3. Algeria
4. Argentina
5. Armenia
6. Australia
7. Austria
8. Azerbaijan
9. Bahrain
10. Belarus
11. Belgium
12. Bosnia and Herzegovina
13. Bulgaria
14. Cambodia
15. Canada
16. Cape Verde
17. Chile
18. China
19. Côte d'Ivoire
20. Croatia
21. Cyprus
22. Czech Republic
23. Denmark
24. Estonia
25. Finland
26. France
27. Georgia
28. Germany
29. Greece

30. Hungary
31. Iceland
32. India
33. Iraq
34. Ireland
35. Israel
36. Italy
37. Japan
38. Jordan
39. Kazakhstan
40. Kyrgyzstan
41. Latvia
42. Libya
43. Lithuania
44. Luxembourg
45. Madagascar
46. Malaysia
47. Malta
48. Mauritius
49. Mexico
50. Moldova
51. Montenegro
52. Morocco
53. Nepal
54. Netherlands
55. New Zealand
56. Nigeria
57. North Macedonia
58. Norway
59. Pakistan

60. Palau
61. Panama
62. Paraguay
63. Philippines
64. Poland
65. Portugal
66. Romania
67. Russia
68. Saudi Arabia
69. Serbia
70. Seychelles
71. Singapore
72. Slovakia
73. Slovenia
74. Spain
75. Sri Lanka
76. South Korea
77. Sweden
78. Switzerland
79. Tajikistan
80. Thailand
81. Turkey
82. Turkmenistan
83. Ukraine
84. United Arab Emirates
85. United Kingdom
86. United States
87. Uzbekistan
88. Vietnam
89. Zambia

IAEA (observer)
UNODC (observer)
EU (observer)
INTERPOL (observer)
UNICRI (observer)
UNOCT (observer)

== Criticisms ==
While the GICNT has garnered many members and held many events, there are some in the academic community who believe there is room for expansion and improvement. In a piece evaluating the GICNT, the Stimson Center notes that the GICNT will be useful for countries to fulfill their UNSCR 1540 commitments. However it points out that many countries that fissile material cannot afford the funds and manpower needed to implement necessary safeguards, and the GICNT does not provide a mechanism to address this shortcoming. WMD Insights published a similar piece that applauded the expansive growth of the GICNT. At the same time, it recognized that this large partnership could impede nations' ability to "harmonize their long-term research and development programs" as well as construct detailed plans for dealing with the "sources, magnitude, and appropriate responses to nuclear terrorist threats." Finally, George Bunn writes that the GICNT is an important first step but has failed to rapidly upgrade security for nuclear stockpiles and places few demands on a country for membership.

== See also ==
- Counter-terrorism
- List of designated terrorist organizations
- List of terrorist incidents
- Lists of nuclear disasters and radioactive incidents
- Nuclear Non-Proliferation Treaty
- Nuclear technology
- Nuclear weapon
- Proliferation Security Initiative
- Terrorism
