= 2012 Nuclear Security Summit =

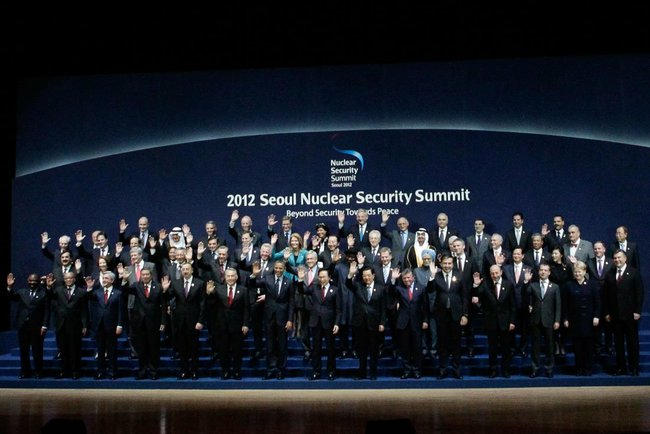
- Host country: South Korea
- Date: March 26–27, 2012
- Cities: Seoul
- Venues: COEX Convention & Exhibition Center
- Participants: 58 representatives
- Follows: 2010 Nuclear Security Summit
- Precedes: 2014 Nuclear Security Summit
- Website: thenuclearsecuritysummit.org

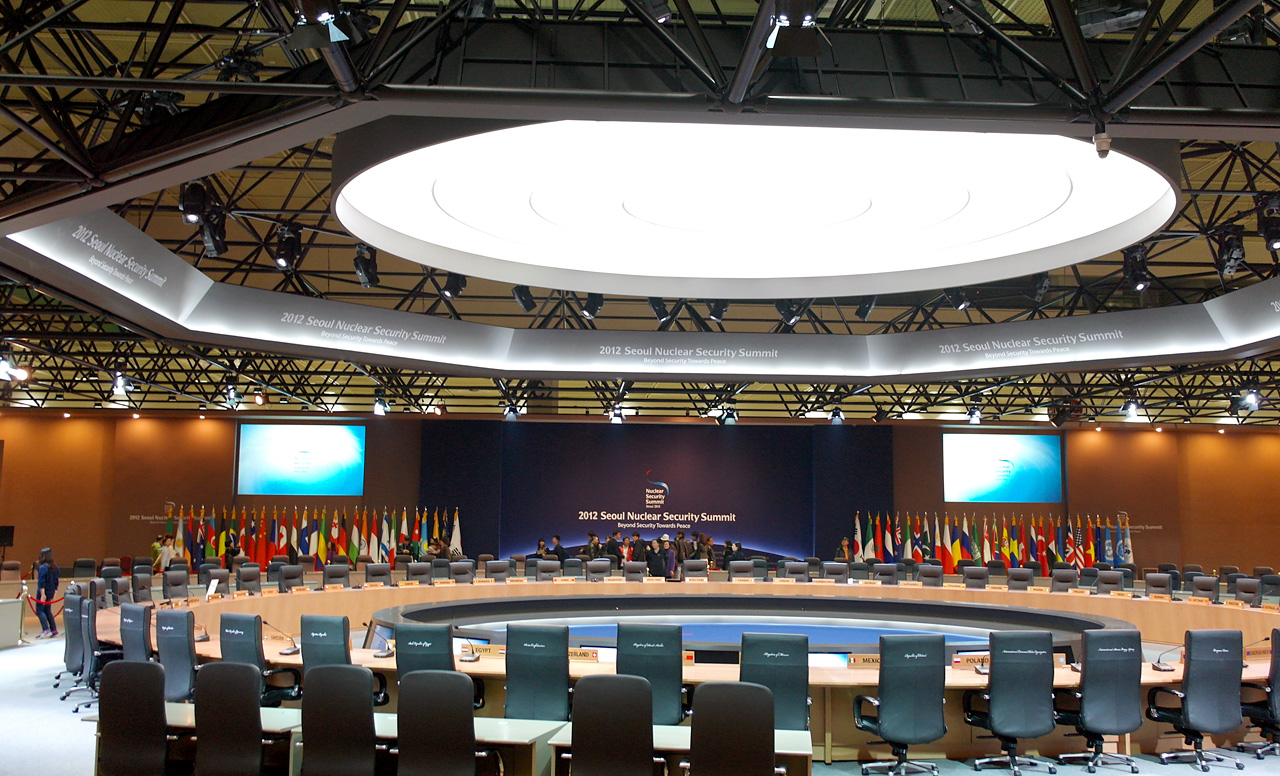
2012 Seoul Nuclear Security Summit Plenary

The 2012 Nuclear Security Summit was a summit held at the COEX Convention & Exhibition Center in Seoul, South Korea, on March 26 and 27, 2012. It was the second time the conference was held after the 2010 Nuclear Security Summit.

The summit series discusses international cooperative measures to protect nuclear materials and facilities from terrorist groups. Fifty-eight world leaders from 53 states and four international organizations, including the United Nations, International Atomic Energy Agency, the European Union and INTERPOL, participated. The main issues discussed were:

- Cooperative measures to combat the threat of nuclear terrorism
- Protection of nuclear materials and related facilities
- Prevention of illicit trafficking of nuclear materials

At the summit, the leaders discussed nuclear terrorism threats and nuclear security preparedness. They also reviewed the implementation of agreements and voluntary commitments. Then the leaders focused on major nuclear security issues, mostly brought up at the Washington summit, such as the minimization and management of highly enriched uranium, ratification of nuclear security conventions, strengthening information and transportation security, IAEA's role, preventing illicit nuclear trafficking, nuclear security culture, and international cooperation and assistance.

In the aftermath of the March 2011 Fukushima nuclear disaster, Korea added a new issues of radiological security and the nuclear security-safety interface to the agenda from the natural disasters since World War II (1939–45) and Korean War (1950-53). The Washington summit had focused on nuclear terrorism with explosive nuclear devices, perceiving that as the biggest threat to international security after 9/11 attacks in New York City in 2001, 3/11 train bombings in Madrid in 2004, and 7/7 bombings in London in 2005. The 2012 summit also discussed protection against dirty bombs and the sabotage of nuclear facilities.

Some states opposed the two new items, saying that they would dilute the focus of the summit.

== Background ==
The first Nuclear Security Summit was held in Washington D.C., U.S.A. on April 12 to 13, 2010. U.S. President Barack Obama, who proposed the Nuclear Security Summit in his April 2009 Prague speech, invited 47 heads of government and heads of states and three representatives of international organizations. In the Prague speech, President Obama announced his vision for a 'world without nuclear weapons' and proposed nuclear security as one of three strategic goals for this vision together with nuclear disarmament and nonproliferation. President Obama also announced a nuclear security goal to secure all vulnerable nuclear materials around the world in four years.

During the Washington summit, Korea was proposed as the second summit host by President Obama, which was accepted.

== Participants ==
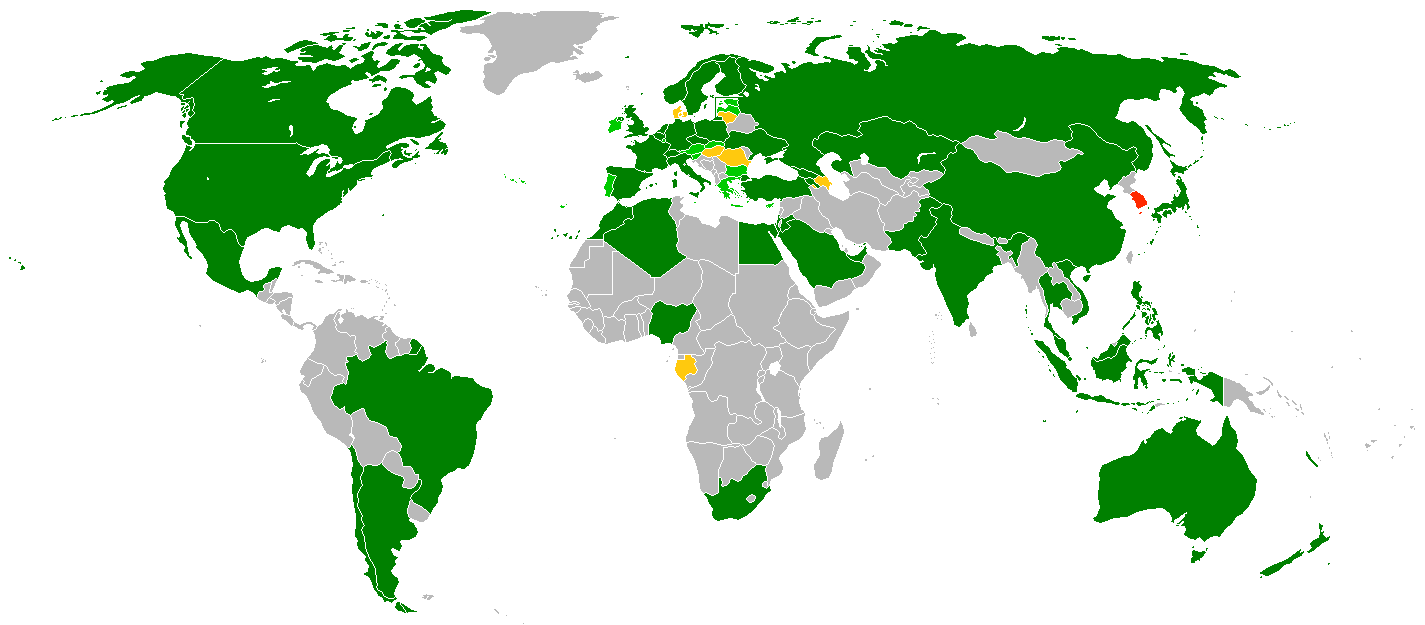
Host state (South Korea) Participating states First-time participating states: Azerbaijan; Denmark; Gabon; Hungary; Lithuania; Romania; European Union states represented by the President of the European Council and the President of the European Commission only

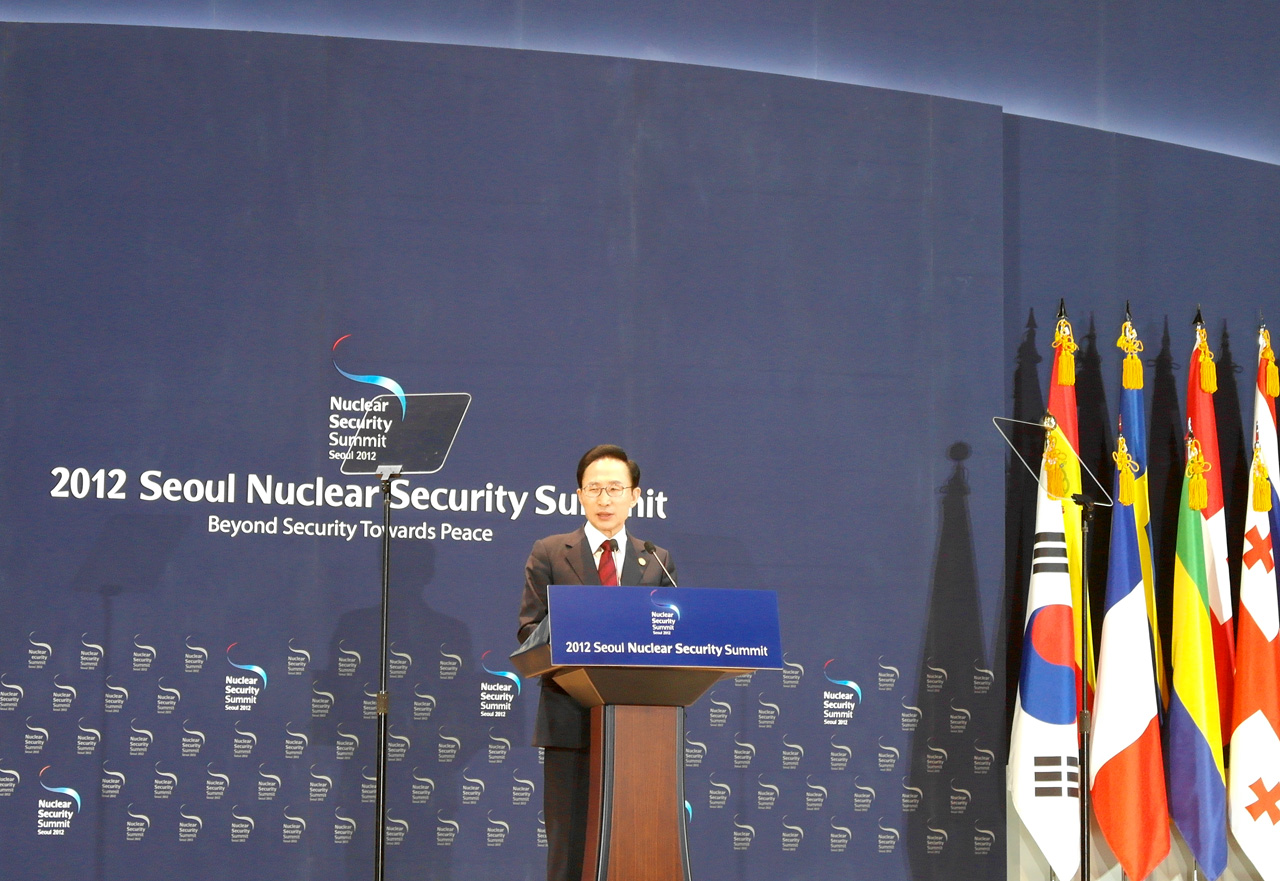
South Korean President Lee Myung-bak speaks to the media during a press conference after the Seoul Nuclear Security Summit at the Convention and Exhibition Center (COEX) in Seoul, South Korea, 27 March 2012.

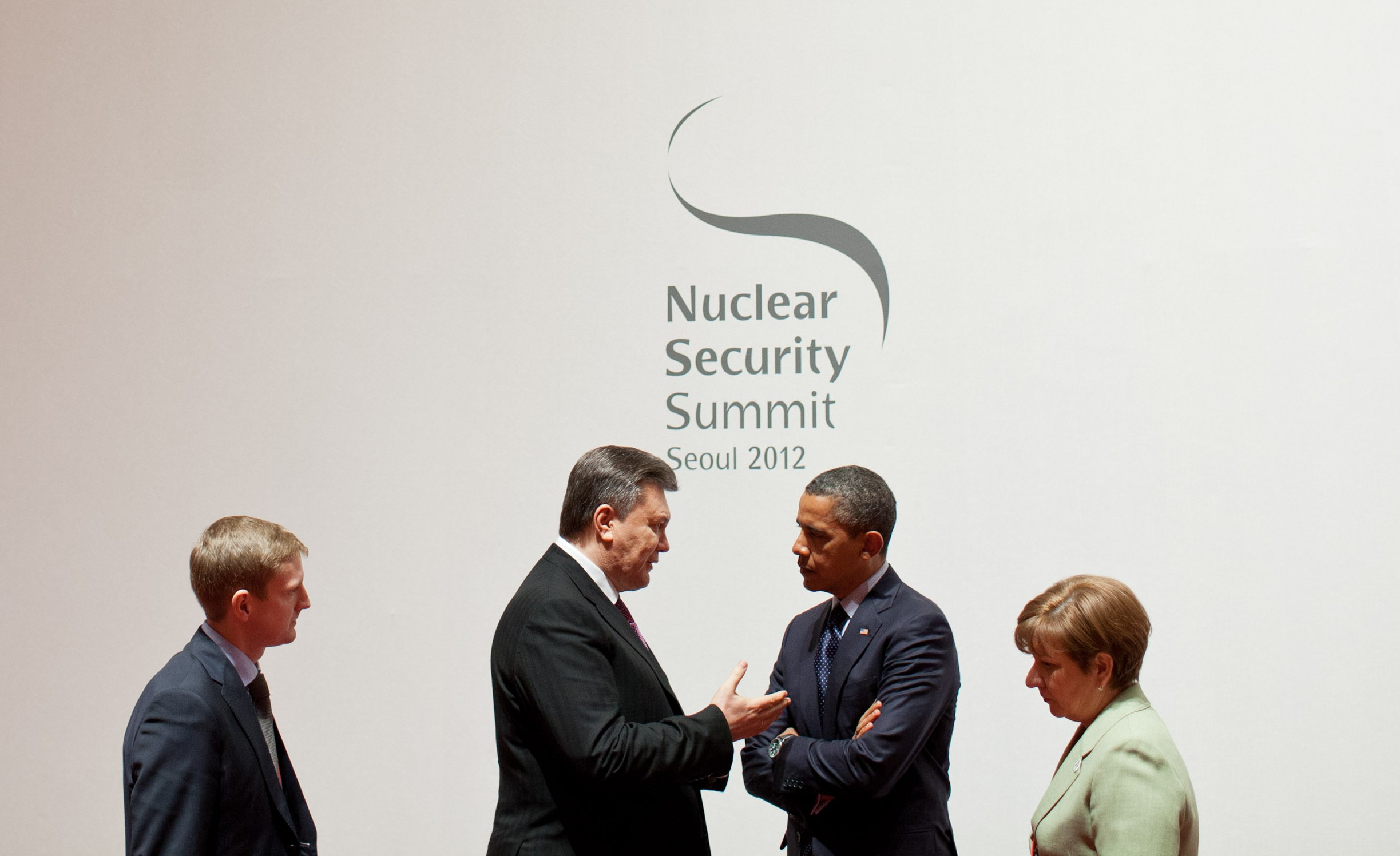
Barack Obama talks with President Viktor Yanukovych of Ukraine

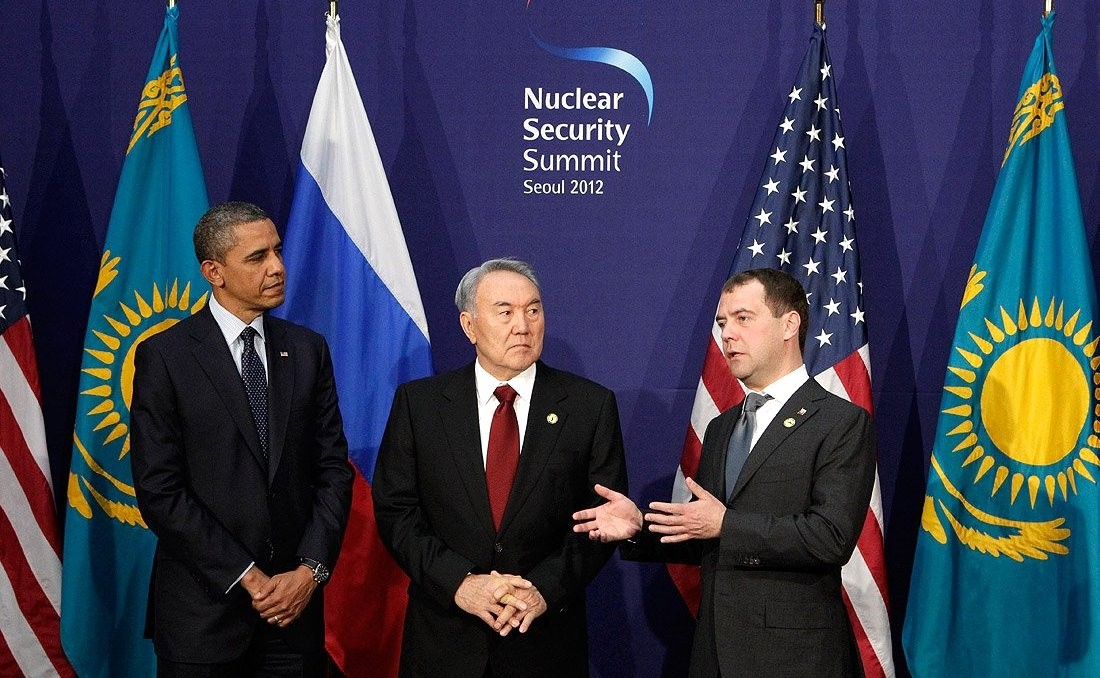
Barack Obama, Nursultan Nazarbayev and Dmitry Medvedev, 2012.

| Country/Organization | Representative(s) |
|---|---|
| Algeria | Abdelaziz Bouteflika (President) |
| Argentina | Hector Timerman (Minister of Foreign Affairs) |
| Armenia | Serzh Sargsyan (President) |
| Australia | Julia Gillard (Prime Minister) |
| Azerbaijan | Ilham Aliyev (President) |
| Belgium | Joëlle Milquet (Deputy Prime Minister) |
| Brazil | Michel Temer (Vice President) |
| Canada | Stephen Harper (Prime Minister) |
| Chile | Sebastián Piñera (President) |
| China | Hu Jintao (President) |
| Czech Republic | Václav Klaus (President) |
| Denmark | Helle Thorning-Schmidt (Prime Minister) |
| Egypt | Mohamed Hussein Tantawi (Chairman of the Supreme Council of the Armed Forces of Egypt) |
| European Union | Herman Van Rompuy (President of the European Council) |
| European Union | José Manuel Barroso (President of the European Commission) |
| Finland | Sauli Niinistö (President) |
| France | Francois Fillon (Prime Minister) |
| Gabon | Ali Bongo Ondimba (President) |
| Georgia | Mikheil Saakashvili (President) |
| Germany | Guido Westerwelle (Minister for Foreign Affairs) |
| Hungary | Pál Schmitt (President) |
| India | Manmohan Singh (Prime Minister) |
| Indonesia | Susilo Bambang Yudhoyono (President) |
| International Atomic Energy Agency | Yukiya Amano (Director-General) |
| Interpol | Ronald Noble (Secretary General) |
| Israel | Dan Meridor (Deputy Prime Minister and Intelligence Services Minister) |
| Italy | Mario Monti (Prime Minister) |
| Japan | Yoshihiko Noda (Prime Minister) |
| Jordan | Abdullah II (King) |
| Kazakhstan | Nursultan Nazarbayev (President) |
| Lithuania | Dalia Grybauskaitė (President) |
| Malaysia | Najib Tun Razak (Prime Minister) |
| Mexico | Felipe Calderón (President) |
| Morocco | Saâdeddine El Othmani (Minister of Foreign Affairs and Cooperation) |
| Netherlands | Uri Rosenthal (Minister of Foreign Affairs) |
| New Zealand | John Key (Prime Minister) |
| Nigeria | Goodluck Jonathan (President) |
| Norway | Jens Stoltenberg (Prime Minister) |
| Pakistan | Raja Pervaiz Ashraf (Prime Minister) |
| Philippines | Jejomar Binay (Vice President) |
| Poland | Marcin Korolec (Minister of Environment) |
| Romania | Traian Băsescu (President) |
| Russia | Dmitry Medvedev (President) |
| Saudi Arabia | Hashim bin Abdullah Yamani (President of KACARE) |
| Singapore | Lee Hsien Loong (Prime Minister) |
| South Africa | Jacob Zuma (President) |
| South Korea (host) | Lee Myung-bak (President) |
| Spain | Mariano Rajoy (Prime Minister) |
| Sweden | Fredrik Reinfeldt (Prime Minister) |
| Switzerland | Didier Burkhalter (Head of the Federal Department of Foreign Affairs) |
| Thailand | Yingluck Shinawatra (Prime Minister) |
| Turkey | Recep Tayyip Erdoğan (Prime Minister) |
| Ukraine | Viktor Yanukovych (President) |
| United Arab Emirates | Mohammed bin Zayed Al Nahyan (Crown Prince of Abu Dhabi) |
| United Kingdom | Nick Clegg (Deputy Prime Minister) |
| United Nations | Ban Ki-moon (Secretary-General) |
| United States | Barack Obama (President) |
| Vietnam | Nguyễn Tấn Dũng (Prime Minister) |

== Schedule and agenda ==
After a reception, on March 27 there was a Morning Session, a Working Luncheon and an Afternoon Session.

The agenda for each session was as follows:

1. March 26 (Monday) -Working Dinner : Review of the Progress Made Since the 2010 Washington Summit 2. March 27 (Tuesday) -Plenary Session I : National Measures and International Cooperation to Enhance Nuclear Security, including Future Commitments -Working Lunch : Nuclear Security-Safety Interface -Plenary Session II : National Measures and International Cooperation to Enhance Nuclear Security, including Future Commitments (cont.).

== Seoul Communiqué ==
The Seoul Communiqué built on the objectives and measures set out in the 2010 Washington Communiqué to identify 11 areas of priority and importance in nuclear security and presents specific actions in each area.

The 11 areas are as follows: the global nuclear security architecture; the role of the IAEA; nuclear materials; radioactive sources; nuclear security and safety; transportation security; combating illicit trafficking; nuclear forensics; nuclear security culture; information security; and international cooperation.

The Seoul Communiqué sets out the following specific actions in the above 11 areas:

- Eliminating and disposing of highly enriched uranium (HEU) no longer in use
- Minimizing the use of HEU
  - Encouraging voluntary announcements by the end of 2013 of specific actions to minimize the use of HEU
- Welcoming international efforts to develop high-density low-enriched uranium (LEU) fuel for the purpose of replacing HEU fuels in research reactors and medical isotope production facilities
- Seeking to bring the 2005 amended Convention on the Physical Protection of Nuclear Materials (CPPNM) into effect by 2014
- Welcoming an international conference in 2013 organized by the IAEA to coordinate nuclear security activities
- Encouraging voluntary contributions to the IAEA Nuclear Security Fund
- Developing options for national policies on HEU management within the framework of the IAEA
- Encouraging national measures and international cooperation to prevent radiological terrorism
- Strengthening the physical protection of nuclear facilities and enhancing emergency response capabilities in the case of radiological accidents while comprehensively addressing nuclear security and nuclear safety concerns
- Strengthening the management of spent nuclear fuels and radioactive wastes
- Strengthening the protection of nuclear materials and radioactive sources in transport
  - Encouraging the establishment of a system to effectively manage and track such materials on a national level
- Preventing the illicit trafficking of nuclear materials
  - Strengthening technical capabilities to search for and detect illicitly trafficked nuclear materials and encouraging the sharing of information on persons involved in such activities by cooperating with the INTERPOL
- Building nuclear forensics capacity to identify the source of illicitly trafficked nuclear materials
- Welcoming the establishment of Centers of Excellence for training and education in nuclear security, and supporting networking activities between each Center
- Strengthening the nuclear security culture
  - Encouraging the participation of industry, academia, the media, NGOs and other civil actors in the discussions on nuclear security
- Strengthening the protection of sensitive nuclear security-related information and enhancing cyber security at nuclear facilities
- Promoting international cooperation, such as the provision of assistance to countries for the enhancement of national nuclear security capabilities upon request
- The hosting of the next Nuclear Security Summit in the Netherlands — see 2014 Nuclear Security Summit

The Seoul Communiqué provides important timelines for advancing nuclear security objectives, such as the target year (end of 2013) for states to announce voluntary actions on minimizing the use of HEU and the goal year (2014) for bringing the amended CPPNM into effect. It reflects the need to address both the issues of nuclear security and nuclear safety in a coherent manner for the sustainable peaceful uses of nuclear energy. It also emphasizes the need to better secure spent nuclear fuel and radioactive waste. It also sets out specific measures to prevent radiological terrorism, an issue only briefly touched upon at the Washington Summit.

== See also ==
- Barack Obama speech in Prague, 2009
- Global Initiative to Combat Nuclear Terrorism
- Nuclear disarmament
  - New START
- Nuclear proliferation
- Proliferation Security Initiative
