= List of international presidential trips made by Barack Obama =

This is a list of international presidential trips made by Barack Obama, the 44th president of the United States. Barack Obama made 52 international trips to 58 countries (in addition to visiting the West Bank) during his presidency, which began on January 20, 2009 and ended on January 20, 2017.

Obama set the record as the most-traveled president for any first year in office: he took the most trips, visited the most countries, and spent the most days abroad. Obama made ten trips to 21 countries (four countries were visited twice) and was out of the U.S. a total of 37 days.

== Summary ==
The number of visits per country where President Obama traveled are:

- One visit to Argentina, Brazil, Cambodia, Chile, Colombia, Costa Rica, Cuba, Egypt, El Salvador, Estonia, Ethiopia, Ghana, Greece, Iraq, Ireland, Jamaica, Jordan, Kenya, Laos, the Netherlands, Norway, Panama, Peru, Senegal, Singapore, Spain, Sweden, Tanzania, Thailand, Trinidad and Tobago, Vietnam, and the West Bank
- Two visits to Australia, Belgium, the Czech Republic, Denmark, India, Indonesia, Israel, Italy, Malaysia, Myanmar, the Philippines, Portugal, Russia, South Africa, Turkey, and the Vatican City
- Three visits to Canada, China, and Poland
- Four visits to Afghanistan, Japan, Saudi Arabia, and South Korea
- Five visits to Mexico and the United Kingdom
- Six visits to France and Germany

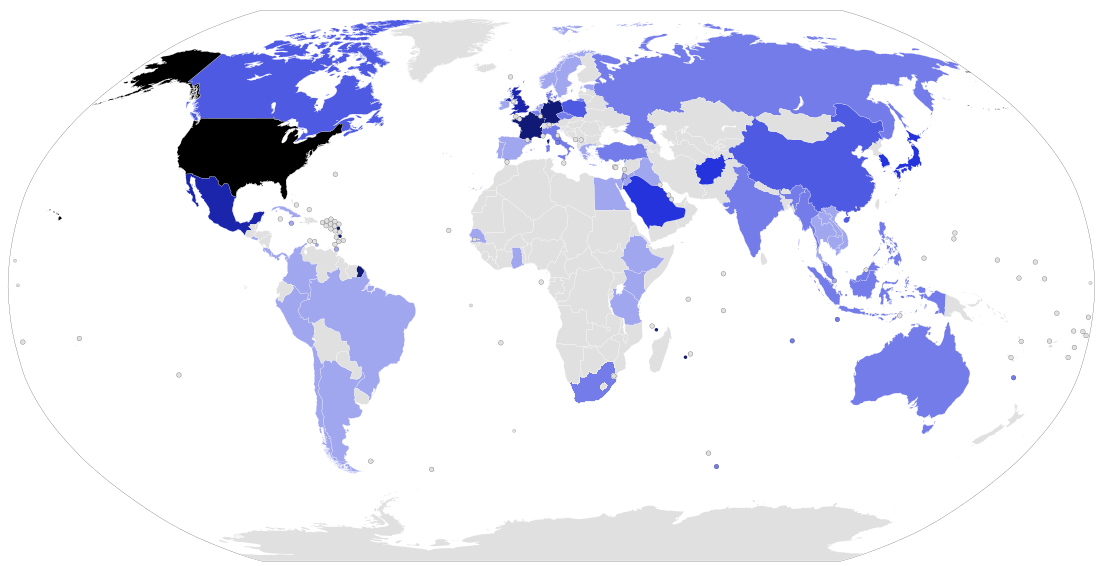
Map of international trips made by Barack Obama as president: United States 6 visits 5 visits 4 visits 3 visits 2 visits 1 visit

== First term (2009–2013) ==
=== 2009 ===
	Country	Areas visited	Dates	Details	Image
1	Canada	Ottawa	February 19	Met with Governor General Michaëlle Jean, Prime Minister Stephen Harper, and Leader of the Opposition Michael Ignatieff. As Obama's first foreign trip, it was regarded in media as a "practice visit" for future diplomatic travel.	
2	United Kingdom	London	March 31 – April 3	Attended the G20 summit. Met with Prime Minister Gordon Brown, Leader of the Opposition David Cameron, and with Queen Elizabeth II.	
2	France	Strasbourg	April 3–4	Attended the NATO Summit Meeting.	
2	Germany	Baden-Baden, Kehl	April 3–4	Attended the NATO Summit Meeting.	
2	Czech Republic	Prague	April 4–5	Attended the U.S.-EU Summit Meeting. Met with President Václav Klaus. Delivered public speech on nuclear disarmament in Hradčany Square.	
2	Turkey	Ankara, Istanbul	April 5–7	Met with President Abdullah Gül and Prime Minister Recep Tayyip Erdoğan, delivered a speech to the Grand National Assembly, and participated in a wreath laying ceremony at Anitkabir Mausoleum. He also met with Ecumenical Patriarch Bartholomew I of Constantinople of the Eastern Orthodox Church in Istanbul, attended the Alliance of Civilizations forum, visited the Hagia Sophia and Blue Mosque, and held a town hall with students at the Tophane Cultural Center.	
2	Iraq	Baghdad	April 7–8	Met with President Jalal Talabani and Prime Minister Nouri al-Maliki. Visited with U.S. troops.	
3	Mexico	Mexico City	April 16–17	Met with President Felipe Calderón.	
3	Trinidad and Tobago	Port of Spain	April 17–18	Attended the 5th Summit of the Americas.	
4	Saudi Arabia	Riyadh	June 3–4	Met with King Abdullah and discussed various regional issues.	
4	Egypt	Cairo	June 4	Met with President Hosni Mubarak. Toured the Giza Pyramids and the Sultan Hassan Mosque. Delivered a speech at Cairo University.	
4	Germany	Dresden, Weimar, Landstuhl	June 4–5	Met with Chancellor Angela Merkel. Visited the Buchenwald concentration camp and visited wounded U.S. military personnel at the Landstuhl Regional Medical Center.	
4	France	Paris, Caen, Normandy	June 5–7	Met with President Nicolas Sarkozy and dedicated the new visitor center at the U.S. Military Cemetery in Normandy. Dignitaries joining with them to commemorate the 65th anniversary of D-Day included British prime minister Gordon Brown, Canadian prime minister Stephen Harper, and Charles, Prince of Wales.	
5	Russia	Moscow	July 6–8	Met with President Dmitry Medvedev and Prime Minister Vladimir Putin. Also delivered a speech to the New Economic School, and met with dissidents and opposition leaders.	
5	Italy	L'Aquila, Rome	July 8–10	Attended the 35th G8 summit. Met Prime Minister Silvio Berlusconi. Also met with President Giorgio Napolitano.	
5	Vatican City	Apostolic Palace	July 10	Audience with Pope Benedict XVI, discussed issues such as poverty, stem-cell research, peace in the Middle East, and the need for Christian-Muslim dialogue.	
5	Ghana	Accra, Cape Coast	July 10–11	Met with President John Atta Mills. Delivered a speech to the Ghanaian Parliament. Toured a former departing point of the trans-Atlantic slave trade, the Cape Coast Castle.	
6	Mexico	Guadalajara	August 9–10	Attended the 5th North American Leaders' Summit with President Felipe Calderón and Canadian prime minister Stephen Harper.	
7	Denmark	Copenhagen	October 2	Met with Queen Margrethe II and Prime Minister Lars Løkke Rasmussen. Addressed a session of the International Olympic Committee in support of the Chicago bid for the 2016 Summer Olympics.	
8	Japan	Tokyo	November 13–14	Met with Emperor Akihito and Prime Minister Yukio Hatoyama, and made a speech at the Suntory Hall. in Tokyo.	
8	Singapore	Singapore	November 14–15	Attended the APEC summit. Also met with Singaporean prime minister Lee Hsien Loong and Indonesian president Susilo Bambang Yudhoyono.	
8	China	Shanghai, Beijing	November 15–18	Met with Shanghai Party Secretary Yu Zhengsheng and Mayor Han Zheng. Took part in a town-hall style meeting with Chinese students, addressing a range of issues such as internet censorship and U.S. arms deals with Taiwan. Held a bilateral meeting with President & CCP general secretary Hu Jintao, and met with Premier Wen Jiabao. Also visited the Forbidden City and the Great Wall of China.	
8	South Korea	Seoul, Osan	November 18–19	Met with President Lee Myung-bak. Visited with U.S. troops at Osan Air Base.	
9	Norway	Oslo	December 10–11	Met with King Harald V and Queen Sonja. Received the 2009 Nobel Peace Prize.	
10	Denmark	Copenhagen	December 18	Attended the United Nations Climate Change Conference. Also met with Chinese premier Wen Jiabao, and with Russian president Dmitry Medvedev to discuss completing a nuclear disarmament treaty to replace the 1994 START I Treaty.	

=== 2010 ===
	Country	Areas visited	Dates	Details	Image
11	Afghanistan	Bagram, Kabul	March 28–29	Met with President Hamid Karzai. Addressed U.S. military personnel.	
11	United Kingdom	RAF Mildenhall	March 29	Stopped en route to Washington D.C.	
12	Czech Republic	Prague	April 8–9	Signed the New Strategic Arms Reduction Treaty with Russian president Dmitry Medvedev. Also met with the presidents of the Czech Republic, Estonia, Latvia, and Romania; and with the prime ministers of Bulgaria, Croatia, Hungary, Lithuania, Poland, Slovakia, and Slovenia at a formal dinner.	
13	Canada	Huntsville, Toronto	June 25–27	Attended the 36th G8 summit and the G20 summit.	
14	Germany	Ramstein Air Base	November 5	Met with military generals. Stopped en route to India.	
14	India	Mumbai, New Delhi	November 6–9	Participated in the U.S.-India Business Council and Entrepreneurship Summit, commemorated the 2008 Mumbai attacks, visited the Mani Bhavan Museum, and held a town hall meeting at St Xavier's College in Mumbai. Met with President Pratibha Patil and Prime Minister Manmohan Singh. Addressed the Indian Parliament. Visited the Humayun's Tomb and the Raj Ghat.	
14	Indonesia	Depok, Jakarta	November 9–10	Met with President Susilo Bambang Yudhoyono. Visited the Istiqlal Mosque and delivered a speech at the University of Indonesia.	
14	South Korea	Seoul	November 10–12	Attended a Veterans Day ceremony at the Yongsan Garrison and met with President Lee Myung-bak. Attended the G20 summit.	
14	Japan	Yokohama, Kamakura	November 12–14	Attended the APEC summit. Met with Prime Minister Naoto Kan.	
15	Portugal	Lisbon	November 19–20	Attend the NATO summit and U.S.-EU Summit meetings. Met with President Aníbal Cavaco Silva and Prime Minister José Sócrates. Attended a meeting of the North Atlantic Council, and met with Georgian president Mikheil Saakashvili on the sidelines.	
16	Afghanistan	Bagram	December 3	Met with U.S. military and diplomatic personnel, thanking them for their contributions to the war effort.	
16	Germany	Ramstein Air Base	December 4	Stopped upon returning to Washington D.C.	

=== 2011 ===
	Country	Areas visited	Dates	Details	Image
17	Brazil	Brasília, Rio de Janeiro	March 19–21	Met with President Dilma Rousseff. Spoke in Rio de Janeiro at the Theatro Municipal, and also visited the favela Cidade de Deus, one of that city's most impoverished neighborhoods.	
17	Chile	Santiago	March 21–22	Met with President Sebastián Piñera. Spoke in Santiago at the Centro Cultural Palacio de La Moneda.	
17	El Salvador	San Salvador	March 22–23	Met with President Mauricio Funes. Visited the San Salvador Cathedral and the tomb of archbishop Óscar Romero.	
18	Ireland	Dublin, Moneygall	May 23	Met President Mary McAleese and with Taoiseach Enda Kenny. Visited ancestral home of Moneygall, and spoke at College Green in Dublin.	
18	United Kingdom	London	May 23–26	Main article: State visit by Barack Obama to the United Kingdom State Visit. Met with Queen Elizabeth II, Prime Minister David Cameron, and also opposition leader Ed Miliband. Laid a wreath on the Tomb of the Unknown Warrior in Westminster Abbey and addressed the UK Parliament.	
18	France	Deauville, Paris	May 26–27	Attended the 37th G8 summit, where he also held bilateral talks with Russian president Dmitry Medvedev, Japanese prime minister Naoto Kan, and French president Nicolas Sarkozy.	
18	Poland	Warsaw	May 27–28	Met with President Bronisław Komorowski and Prime Minister Donald Tusk, and with Central and Eastern European leaders during a dinner hosted by President Komorowski. Laid a wreath at both the Tomb of the Unknown Soldier and the Warsaw Ghetto Memorial, and met with Jewish community leaders and Holocaust survivors at the Warsaw Ghetto Memorial. Visited the memorial to the victims of the Smolensk plane crash.	
19	France	Cannes	November 3–4	Attended the G20 summit; also held bilateral talks with French president Nicolas Sarkozy, German chancellor Angela Merkel and President Cristina Fernández de Kirchner of Argentina.	
20	Australia	Canberra, Darwin	November 16–17	Met with Australian prime minister Julia Gillard, and addressed the Australian Parliament. At Darwin, commemorated the 60th anniversary of the ANZUS alliance, and participated in a wreath laying ceremony with Prime Minister Gillard at USS Peary Memorial.	
20	Indonesia	Nusa Dua	November 17–19	Attended the 19th ASEAN summit and 6th East Asia Summit meetings.	

=== 2012 ===
	Country	Areas visited	Dates	Details	Image
21	South Korea	Seoul	March 25–27	Attended the Nuclear Security Summit; held bilateral meetings with President Lee Myung-bak of South Korea, Prime Minister Erdoğan of Turkey, President Medvedev of Russia, President Nursultan Nazarbayev of Kazakhstan, President & CCP General Secretary Hu Jintao of China and Prime Minister Yousaf Raza Gillani of Pakistan. Visited the Korean Demilitarized Zone, and delivered remarks at Hankuk University of Foreign Studies in Seoul.	
22	Colombia	Cartagena	April 13–15	Attended the 6th Summit of the Americas. Announced, along with President Juan Manuel Santos, that the United States–Colombia Free Trade Agreement will take effect May 15, 2012. Attended an event with President Santos in which the Colombian government handed over land titles to representatives of the Afro-Colombian community at the Plaza de San Pedro in Cartagena, and visited the Spanish colonial-era Castillo San Felipe de Barajas.	
23	Afghanistan	Kabul	May 1–2	Met with President Karzai and addressed U.S. military personnel. Signed a long-term strategic partnership agreement between Afghanistan and United States. Addressed the nation from there regarding the responsible end of the Afghanistan war.	
23	Germany	Ramstein Air Base	May 2	Stopped upon returning to Washington D.C.	
24	Mexico	Cabo San Lucas	June 17–19	Attended the G20 summit; also met with several European heads of state and government to discuss the European sovereign-debt crisis, and held bilateral meetings with Russian president Vladimir Putin, Mexican president Felipe Calderón, German chancellor Angela Merkel, Chinese president & CCP General Secretary Hu Jintao and Turkish prime minister Recep Tayyip Erdoğan.	
25	Germany	Ramstein Air Base	November 17	Stopped en route to Thailand.	
25	Thailand	Bangkok	November 18–19	Met with King Bhumibol Adulyadej and Prime Minister Yingluck Shinawatra. Visited the Wat Pho Monastery.	
25	Myanmar (Burma)	Yangon	November 19	Met with President Thein Sein, and toured the Shwedagon Pagoda. Met with National League for Democracy leader Aung San Suu Kyi, and representatives of Myanmar civil society organizations, including an advocate for Myanmar’s Rohingya population, Also delivered a speech at the University of Yangon. Became the first sitting U.S president to visit the country.	
25	Cambodia	Phnom Penh	November 19–20	Attended 21st ASEAN summit; 7th East Asia Summit where he held bilateral meetings with Japanese prime minister Yoshihiko Noda and Chinese premier Wen Jiabao; and Trans-Pacific Partnership meetings. Met with Prime Minister Hun Sen. Became the first U.S. president to visit the country.	
25	Japan	Yokota Air Base	November 21	Stopped during return to Washington D.C.	

== Second term (2013–2017) ==
=== 2013 ===
	Country	Areas visited	Dates	Details	Image
26	Israel	Tel Aviv, Jerusalem	March 20–22	Met with Israeli President Shimon Peres and Prime Minister Benjamin Netanyahu. Visited the Shrine of the Book and Yad Vashem, and laid wreaths at the graves of Theodor Herzl and Yitzhak Rabin. Also spoke to students at the International Convention Center.	
26	Palestinian National Authority (West Bank)	Ramallah, Al-Bireh, Bethlehem	March 21, 22	Met with Palestinian president Mahmoud Abbas, and Palestinian prime minister Salam Fayyad. Visited a youth center in al-Bireh, and the Church of the Nativity.	
26	Jordan	Amman, Petra	March 22–23	Met with King Abdullah II.	
27	Mexico	Mexico City	May 2–3	Met with President Enrique Peña Nieto, and gave an address at the National Anthropology Museum.	
27	Costa Rica	San José	May 3–4	Met with President Laura Chinchilla and other heads of state attending the Central American Integration System summit.	
28	United Kingdom	Enniskillen, Belfast	June 17–18	Attended the 39th G8 summit in County Fermanagh, Northern Ireland, and held a held a bilateral meeting with Russian president Vladimir Putin. Also spoke to a group of students in Belfast about the legacy of the Northern Ireland peace process and the Good Friday Agreement.	
28	Germany	Berlin	June 18–19	Met with German president Joachim Gauck and Chancellor Angela Merkel. Delivered a speech in front of the Brandenburg Gate. and also met with Peer Steinbrück, the Social Democratic candidate for Chancellor in the 2013 federal election.	
29	Senegal	Dakar	June 26–28	Met with President Macky Sall, and visited Senegal's supreme court for a meeting with regional judicial leaders. Visited the House of Slaves on Gorée and met with civil society leaders at the Goree Institute. Also met with farmers and other members of Senegal's agriculture sector to discuss food security.	
29	South Africa	Johannesburg, Pretoria, Soweto, Cape Town	June 28 – July 1	Met with President Jacob Zuma. Also met (separately) with African Union Commission Chair Nkosazana Dlamini-Zuma, and with members of the Mandela family. Attended a town hall at the Soweto campus of the University of Johannesburg. Delivered a speech at the University of Cape Town, attended a community health discussion at the Desmond Tutu HIV Foundation Youth Center, and visited Robben Island.	
29	Tanzania	Dar es Salaam	July 1–2	Met with President Jakaya Kikwete. Participated in a round-table meeting with American and African business leaders to discuss trade and investment. Laid a wreath at the memorial to the 1998 U.S. embassy bombing. With the president, in addition to First Lady Michelle Obama, were former president George and former first lady Laura Bush	
29	Senegal	Dakar	July 2	Stopped during return to Washington D.C.	
30	Sweden	Stockholm	September 4–5	Met with King Carl XVI Gustaf and Prime Minister Fredrik Reinfeldt. Also met with leaders of the Nordic countries. Attended an event honoring Raoul Wallenberg at the Great Synagogue of Stockholm.	
30	Russia	St. Petersburg	September 5–6	Attended the G20 summit.	
31	Senegal	Dakar	December 9	Stopped en route to South Africa	
31	South Africa	Johannesburg	December 10	Attended the Nelson Mandela funeral. Former presidents Jimmy Carter, Bill Clinton, and George W. Bush also attended.	
31	Senegal	Dakar	December 11	Stopped during return to Washington D.C.	

=== 2014 ===
	Country	Areas visited	Dates	Details	Image
32	Mexico	Toluca	February 19	Attended the 7th North American Leaders' Summit with President Enrique Peña Nieto and Canadian prime minister Stephen Harper.	
33	Netherlands	Amsterdam, The Hague	March 24–25	Attended the Nuclear Security Summit. Also attended the G-7 summit on the crisis in Ukraine and the annexation of Crimea by the Russian Federation. Met with Prime Minister Mark Rutte, and with King Willem-Alexander.	
33	Belgium	Waregem, Brussels	March 25–26	Attended the U.S.-EU Summit Meeting, and held bilateral meetings with Belgian government officials and with the NATO secretary general. Visited the Flanders Field American Cemetery and Memorial with King Philippe and Prime Minister Elio Di Rupo. Delivered a speech at the Centre for Fine Arts (BOZAR).	
33	Vatican City	Apostolic Palace	March 27	Audience with Pope Francis.	
33	Italy	Rome	March 26–28	Met with President Napolitano and Prime Minister Renzi.	
33	Saudi Arabia	Riyadh	March 28–29	Met with King Abdullah.	
33	Germany	Ramstein Air Base	March 29	Visited wounded military personnels at the Landstuhl Regional Medical Center.	
34	Japan	Tokyo	April 23–25	Met with Emperor Akihito and Prime Minister Shinzō Abe. Met with students and viewed an ASIMO robot exhibit at the Miraikan and visited the Meiji Shrine,	
34	South Korea	Seoul	April 25–26	Attended a wreath-laying ceremony at the War Memorial of Korea, visited Gyeongbokgung Palace, then met with President Park Geun-hye. Visited with U.S. troops at Yongsan Garrison.	
34	Malaysia	Kuala Lumpur	April 26–28	Met with Prime Minister Najib Razak, and with King Abdul Halim; visited the National Mosque of Malaysia. Delivered remarks at the Malaysian Global Innovation and Creativity Centre and participated in the Young Southeast Asian Leaders Initiative Town Hall meeting at the University of Malaya.	
34	Philippines	Manila, Pasay, Taguig	April 28–29	Met with President Benigno Aquino III. Met with American and Filipino troops at Fort Bonifacio, and attended a wreath-laying ceremony and toured the Manila American Cemetery and Memorial.	
35	Afghanistan	Bagram	May 25	Visited with U.S. troops.	
35	Germany	Ramstein Air Base	May 26	Stopped upon returning to Washington D.C.	
36	Poland	Warsaw	June 3–4	Met with President Bronisław Komorowski and Prime Minister Donald Tusk. Attended ceremonies marking the 25th anniversary of democracy in Poland. Also met with President-elect Petro Poroshenko of Ukraine.	
36	Belgium	Brussels	June 4–5	Attended the 40th G7 summit.	
36	France	Paris, Omaha Beach, Benouville, Ouistreham	June 5–6	Met with President François Hollande. Attended the 70th anniversary of D-Day memorial ceremonies.	
37	Estonia	Tallinn	September 3	Met with the presidents of the Baltic states. Visited with U.S. and Estonian members of the military. Delivered a speech at Tallinn Airport with Prime Minister Taavi Rõivas.	
37	United Kingdom	Newport	September 3–5	Attended the NATO summit.	
38	China	Beijing	November 10–12	Attended the APEC summit. Met with President & CCP general secretary Xi Jinping, Premier Li Keqiang and NPC Chairman Zhang Dejiang. Also met with Australian prime minister Tony Abbott, and Indonesian president Joko Widodo.	
38	Myanmar (Burma)	Naypyidaw, Yangon	November 12–14	Attended the 25th ASEAN Summit and the 9th East Asia Summit. Met with President Thein Sein and National League for Democracy Leader Aung San Suu Kyi. Participated in the Young Southeast Asian Leaders Initiative Town Hall meeting at the University of Yangon.	
38	Australia	Brisbane	November 15–16	Attended the G20 summit. Held a trilateral meeting with Prime Minister Tony Abbott and Japanese prime minister Shinzō Abe, and delivered a speech at the University of Queensland regarding youth voice.	

=== 2015 ===
	Country	Areas visited	Dates	Details	Image
39	Germany	Ramstein Air Base	January 24	Stopped en route to India.	
39	India	New Delhi	January 25–27	Met with Prime Minister Narendra Modi. Participated in the Indian Republic Day celebration. Addressed an event organized by the U.S.-India Business Council.	
39	Saudi Arabia	Riyadh	January 27	Met with the newly appointed King Salman. Also paid respects to the late King Abdullah.	
39	Germany	Ramstein Air Base	January 27	Stopped during return to Washington D.C.	
40	Jamaica	Kingston	April 8–9	Met with Prime Minister Portia Simpson-Miller. Visited the Bob Marley Museum. Attended a town hall meeting at the University of the West Indies. Laid wreath at the National Heroes Park.	
40	Panama	Panama City	April 9–11	Attended the 7th Summit of the Americas. Also met with President of Cuban Council of State Raúl Castro.	
41	Germany	Krün	June 7–8	Attended the 41st G7 summit. Met with Chancellor Angela Merkel for a traditional Frühschoppen breakfast with the village locals in Krün. Also met with French president François Hollande to discuss the Russo-Ukrainian War and Iran's nuclear program.	
42	Germany	Ramstein Air Base	July 24	Stopped en route to Kenya.	
42	Kenya	Nairobi	July 24–26	State visit. Attended the 2015 Global Entrepreneurship Summit, and an innovation fair organized to promote his "Power Africa" initiative of promoting electric power and renewable energy in the Sub-Saharan Africa. Laid a wreath a memorial honoring the victims of the 1998 U.S. embassy bombings. Dined with other members of his paternal family. Met with President Uhuru Kenyatta, In the evening, the president was hosted a state dinner by President Kenyatta. and delivered a speech at the Safaricom Indoor Arena.	
42	Ethiopia	Addis Ababa	July 26–28	Met with the government of Ethiopia. Visited the African Union headquarters.	
42	Germany	Ramstein Air Base	July 28	Stopped during return to Washington D.C.	
43	Turkey	Antalya	November 15–16	Attended the G20 summit. Also met with Turkish president Recep Tayyip Erdoğan, Canadian prime minister Justin Trudeau, King Salman of Saudi Arabia, and with Russian president Vladimir Putin.	
43	Philippines	Manila, Pasay	November 17–20	Attended the APEC Economic Leaders' Meeting; held bilateral meetings with Philippine president Benigno Aquino III, Japanese prime minister Shinzō Abe and newly elected prime ministers Malcolm Turnbull of Australia and Justin Trudeau of Canada, as well as meetings with Trans-Pacific Partnership and Pacific Alliance leaders.	
43	Malaysia	Kuala Lumpur	November 20–22	Attended the 26th ASEAN Summit, and also held separate meetings with Lao prime minister Thongsing Thammavong and Singaporean prime minister Lee Hsien Loong. Attended the 10th East Asia Summit. Also met with refugees, many of whom were Rohingya refugees, participated in the Young Southeast Asian Leaders Initiative (YSAELI) town hall at Taylor's University, and met with Malaysian civil society groups.	
43	Japan	Yokota Air Base	November 22–23	Stopped during return to Washington D.C.	
44	France	Paris	November 29 – December 1	Attended the 2015 United Nations Climate Change Conference; held separate bilateral meetings with Chinese president & CCP general secretary Xi Jinping, Indian prime minister Narendra Modi, and Turkish president Recep Tayyip Erdoğan. Also joined President François Hollande and Paris mayor Anne Hidalgo in paying respects to the victims of the Paris attacks by laying flowers in front of the Bataclan.	

=== 2016 ===
	Country	Areas visited	Dates	Details	Image
45	Cuba	Havana	March 20–22	Met with Cardinal Jaime Ortega, the Archbishop of Havana. Paid respects to Cuban national hero José Martí during a brief wreath-laying ceremony at his memorial at Havana's Plaza de la Revolución. Met with President of Cuban Council of State Raúl Castro. U.S. Secretaries John Kerry and Penny Pritzker of State and Commerce, respectively, were in attendance, while Vice President Miguel Díaz-Canel and Foreign Minister Bruno Rodríguez Parrilla were among the several Cuban ministers who participated in the discussions. Also attended an event with U.S. and Cuban entrepreneurs, addressed the Cuban people on national television, and met with various Cuban dissidents and leaders of civil society organizations. Attended an exhibition baseball game between the Tampa Bay Rays and the Cuba national baseball team at the Estadio Latinoamericano with President Castro.	
45	Argentina	Buenos Aires, Bariloche	March 23–24	Met with President Mauricio Macri. Laid a wreath at the Buenos Aires Metropolitan Cathedral tomb of Argentine general José de San Martín Visited the Remembrance park with President Macri to honor the victims of the Dirty War by throwing flowers onto the Río de la Plata river. Held a town hall meeting with young Argentine leaders and entrepreneurs at Usina del Arte and toured the Nahuel Huapi National Park in Bariloche.	
46	Germany	Ramstein Air Base	April 20	Stopped en route to Saudi Arabia.	
46	Saudi Arabia	Riyadh	April 20–21	Attended a summit meeting with the Gulf Cooperation Council. Met with King Salman, and held an audience with the Saudi royal court.	
46	United Kingdom	London, Windsor, Watford	April 21–24	Attended a private lunch with Queen Elizabeth II and Prince Philip at Windsor Castle. Met with British prime minister David Cameron, and later with Labour Party and Opposition Leader Jeremy Corbyn. Also participated in town hall meeting with the British youth at Lindley Hall.	
46	Germany	Hanover	April 24–25	Met with German chancellor Angela Merkel, and other European leaders, including British prime minister David Cameron, French president François Hollande, and Italian prime minister Matteo Renzi. Attended the Hannover Messe.	
47	Japan	Yokota Air Base	May 22	Stopped en route to Vietnam.	
47	Vietnam	Hanoi, Ho Chi Minh City	May 22–25	Met with General Secretary of the Communist Party of Vietnam Nguyễn Phú Trọng, President Trần Đại Quang and Prime Minister Nguyễn Xuân Phúc Dined with American celebrity chef Anthony Bourdain, who was in Vietnam filming for an episode of Bourdain's show, Anthony Bourdain: Parts Unknown. Met with ten activists advocating to solve social issues facing Vietnam, including freedom of speech, freedom of the press and Internet freedom, and addressed the Vietnamese people from the Vietnam National Convention Center. Also visited the Jade Emperor Pagoda in Ho Chi Minh City, met with young entrepreneurs and the local business community, and participated in the Young Southeast Asian Leaders Initiative (YSAELI) town hall.	
47	Japan	Shima, Hiroshima	May 25–27	Met with Japanese prime minister Shinzō Abe. Attended the 42nd G7 summit. Also visited the Hiroshima Peace Memorial Park, the first incumbent American president to visit this memorial to the victims of the U.S. atomic bombing of Hiroshima in August 1945.	
48	Canada	Ottawa, Gatineau	June 29	State visit. Met with Canadian governor general David Johnston and Canadian prime minister Justin Trudeau and addressed a joint session of the Canadian Parliament. Attended the 10th North American Leaders' Summit with Prime Minister Trudeau and Mexican president Enrique Peña Nieto.	
49	Poland	Warsaw	July 8–9	Attended the 27th NATO summit meeting. The agenda focused on strengthening defense cooperation to protect Eastern Europe from Russian aggression on Ukraine, confronting the Islamic State in Iraq and Syria, the European migrant crisis, and the United Kingdom withdrawal from the European Union. Also met with Polish president Andrzej Duda, European Council President, former Polish prime minister Donald Tusk, and European Commission President Jean-Claude Juncker to discuss counterterrorism, and the Syrian refugee crisis. Also addressed American public following the shooting of Alton Sterling in Baton Rouge, Louisiana and the shooting of Philando Castile in Minnesota, cases which led to protests in the U.S. and allegations of racial injustice and profiling by police.	
49	Spain	Madrid, Rota	July 9–10	Met with King Felipe VI and Prime Minister Mariano Rajoy. Also met with American military personnel stationed at Naval Station Rota.	
50	China	Hangzhou	September 3–5	Attended the G20 summit.	
50	Laos	Vientiane, Luang Prabang	September 5–8	Attended the 27th ASEAN Summit and the 11th East Asia Summit, becoming the first U.S. president to visit the country.	
50	Japan	Yokota Air Base	September 9	Stopped during return to Washington D.C.	
51	Israel	Jerusalem	September 30	Attended the state funeral of former Israeli president and prime minister Shimon Peres.	
52	Greece	Athens	November 15–16	State Visit. Met with Prime Minister Alexis Tsipras and President Prokopis Pavlopoulos. Delivered a speech at the Stavros Niarchos Foundation Cultural Center, Toured Acropolis and Acropolis Museum.	
52	Germany	Berlin	November 16–18	Met with Chancellor Angela Merkel, French president François Hollande, Spanish prime minister Mariano Rajoy, Italian prime minister Matteo Renzi, and British prime minister Theresa May. Met with European leaders of the "Quint": German chancellor Angela Merkel, French president François Hollande, British prime minister Theresa May, Italian prime minister Matteo Renzi, and Spanish prime minister Mariano Rajoy. The leaders discussed trade, the Russo-Ukrainian War, the Syrian Civil War, and ISIL.	
52	Portugal	Terceira Island	November 18	Air Force One refueling stop at Lajes Air Base.	
52	Peru	Lima	November 18–20	Attended the APEC summit, and held bilateral meetings with Peruvian president Pedro Pablo Kuczynski, Chinese president & CCP General Secretary Xi Jinping, Australian prime minister Malcolm Turnbull and Canadian prime minister Justin Trudeau. Also hosted a Young Leaders of the Americas Initiative town hall at the Pontifical Catholic University of Peru.	

== Multilateral meetings ==
Multilateral meetings of the following intergovernmental organizations took place during Barack Obama's presidency (2009–2017).

Group	Year							
Group	2009	2010	2011	2012	2013	2014	2015	2016
APEC	November 14–15; Singapore	November 13–14 (Japan) Yokohama	November 12–13 (United States) Honolulu	September 9–10^{[a]} (Russia) Vladivostok	October 5–7^{[c]} (Indonesia) Denpasar	November 10–11 (China) Beijing	November 18–19 (Philippines) Manila	November 19–20 (Peru) Lima
EAS (ASEAN)			November 18–19 (Indonesia) Nusa Dua	November 19–20 (Cambodia) Phnom Penh	October 9–10^{[c]} (Brunei) Bandar Seri Begawan	November 12–13 (Myanmar) Naypyidaw	November 21–22 (Malaysia) Kuala Lumpur	September 6–8 (Laos) Vientiane
G8 / G7	July 8–10 (Italy) L'Aquila	June 25–26 (Canada) Huntsville	May 26–27 (France) Deauville	May 18–19 (United States) Camp David	June 17–18 (United Kingdom) Enniskillen	June 4–5 (Belgium) Brussels	June 7–8 (Germany) Krün	May 26–27 (Japan) Shima
G20	April 2 (United Kingdom) London	June 26–27 (Canada) Toronto	November 3–4 (France) Cannes	June 18–19 (Mexico) Los Cabos	September 5–6 (Russia) Saint Petersburg	November 15–16 (Australia) Brisbane	November 15–16 (Turkey) Antalya	September 4–5 (China) Hangzhou
G20	September 24–25 (United States) Pittsburgh	November 11–12 (South Korea) Seoul	November 3–4 (France) Cannes	June 18–19 (Mexico) Los Cabos	September 5–6 (Russia) Saint Petersburg	November 15–16 (Australia) Brisbane	November 15–16 (Turkey) Antalya	September 4–5 (China) Hangzhou
NATO	April 3–4 (France) Strasbourg (Germany) Kehl	November 19–20 (Portugal) Lisbon	none	May 20–21 (United States) Chicago	none	September 4–5 (United Kingdom) Newport	none	July 8–9 (Poland) Warsaw
SOA (OAS)	April 17–19 (Trinidad and Tobago) Port of Spain	none	none	April 14–15 (Colombia) Cartagena	none	none	April 10–11; Panama City	none
NSS	none	April 12–13 (United States) Washington	none	March 26–27 (South Korea) Seoul	none	March 24–25 (Netherlands) The Hague	none	March 31 – April 1 (United States) Washington
NALS	August 9–10 (Mexico) Guadalajara	none	none	April 2 (United States) Washington	none	February 19 (Mexico) Toluca	none	June 29 (Canada) Ottawa
UNCCC	December 18 (Denmark) Copenhagen	none	none	none	none	none	November 30 (France) Paris	none
Others	U.S.–EU Summit; April 4–5 (Czech Republic) Prague	U.S.–EU Summit; May 24–25^{[d]} (Spain) Madrid	none	none	none	U.S.–EU Summit; March 26–27 (Belgium) Brussels	none	U.S.–ASEAN Summit; February 15–16 (United States) Rancho Mirage
Others	U.S.–EU Summit; April 4–5 (Czech Republic) Prague	U.S.–EU Summit; May 24–25^{[d]} (Spain) Madrid	none	none	none	U.S.–Africa Summit; August 4–6 (United States) Washington	none	U.S.–ASEAN Summit; February 15–16 (United States) Rancho Mirage
██ = Did not attend; ██ = No meeting held;^aHillary Clinton attended in the President's place due to the upcoming presidential election. • ^bJohn Kerry attended in the President's place due to the US government shutdown. • ^cJoe Biden attended in the President's place.

== See also ==
- Foreign policy of the Obama administration
- Foreign policy of the United States
- List of international trips made by Hillary Clinton as United States Secretary of State
- List of international trips made by John Kerry as United States Secretary of State
