= 2010 Nuclear Security Summit =

Nuclear Security Summit in Washington DC

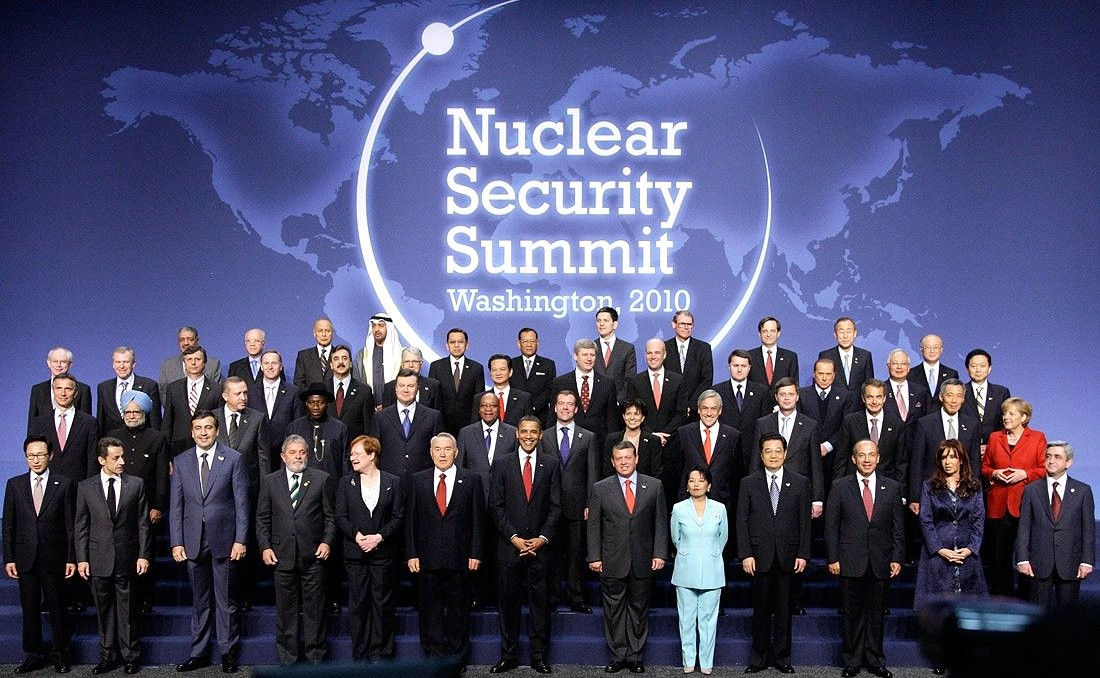
- Host country: United States
- Date: April 12–13, 2010
- Cities: Washington, D.C.
- Venues: Walter E. Washington Convention Center
- Participants: 50 representatives
- Precedes: 2012 Nuclear Security Summit

The 2010 Nuclear Security Summit was a summit held in Washington, D.C., on April 12 and 13, 2010. The Summit focused on how to better safeguard weapons-grade plutonium and uranium to prevent nuclear terrorism.

== Overview ==
The New START treaty was signed on April 8, 2010, in Prague by United States President Barack Obama and President of Russia Dmitry Medvedev. After this summit, Iran hosted its own conference, International Conference on Disarmament and Non-Proliferation, on April 17–18 (see below). Then in May 2010, the 2010 review conference for the Treaty on the Non-Proliferation of Nuclear Weapons (NPT) was held at United Nations headquarters in New York.

== Background ==
With the fall of the Soviet Union, the nuclear weapons existing within the former Soviet territory became a concern. There was a priority in disarming the remaining weapons, as well as reducing the number of development facilities and materials. Following the 9/11 attacks in 2001, the possibility of terrorists misusing nuclear materials and facilities became a real threat, and nuclear security was highlighted as a means to combat the threat of nuclear terrorism.

On April 5, 2009, in Prague, U.S. President Barack Obama had presented a three-part strategy to address the international nuclear threat. The strategy consisted 1.) proposing measures to reduce and eventually eliminate existing nuclear arsenals; 2.) strengthening the Non-proliferation Treaty and halting proliferation of nuclear weapons to additional states; and 3.) preventing terrorists from acquiring nuclear weapons or materials. The President stated in his Prague speech that nuclear terrorism is the most immediate and extreme threat to global security. He announced an international effort to secure vulnerable nuclear materials within four years, break up black markets, detect and intercept materials in transit, and use financial tools to disrupt illicit trade in nuclear materials. In the 2009 L'Aquila Summit held in Italy Obama formally announced his plan to host a Global Nuclear Security Summit in March 2010 for this purpose.

== Participants ==
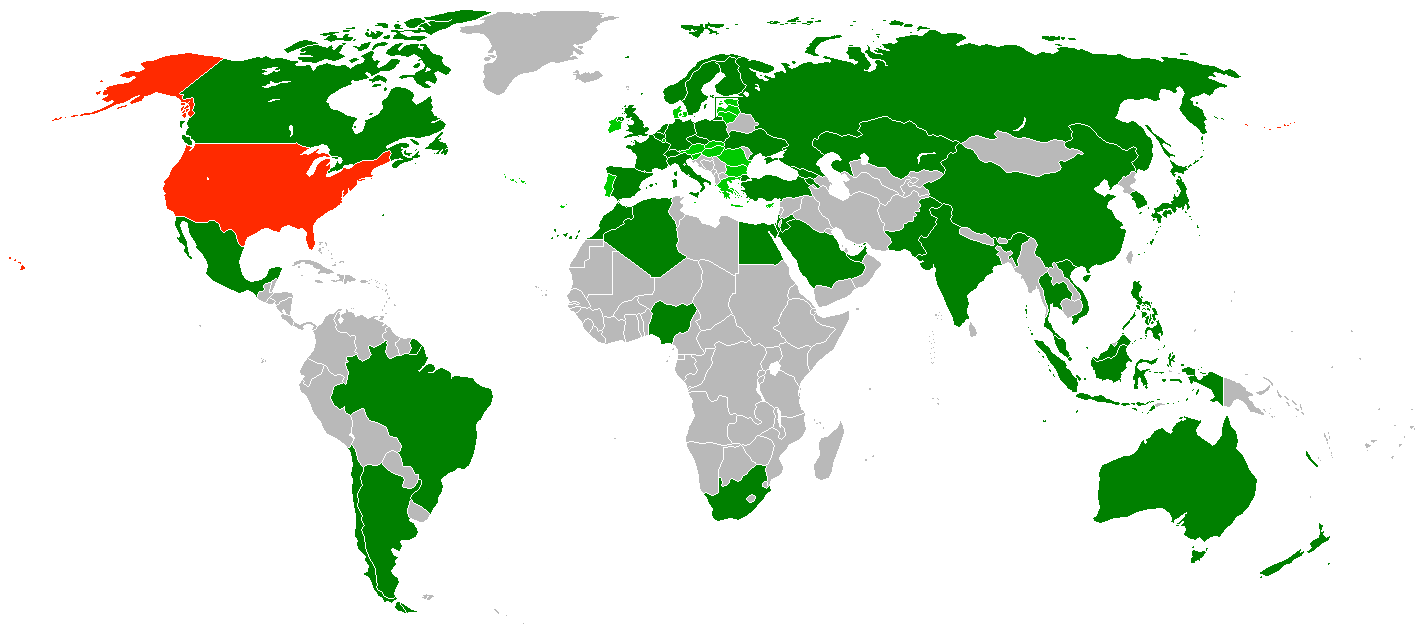
Host nation (United States) Participating nations European Union members represented by the President of the European Council only

The Summit was the largest gathering of heads of state called by a United States president since the 1945 United Nations Conference on International Organization. Delegations from forty-seven governments including the United States attended, thirty-eight of which were represented by heads of state or government. Delegations from the European Union, the International Atomic Energy Agency, and the United Nations also attended.

Israeli Prime Minister Benjamin Netanyahu canceled his plans to attend the Summit due to concerns that there would be demands for Israel to sign the Nuclear Non-Proliferation Treaty.

The United Kingdom was the only official nuclear weapons state (as recognised under the NPT) not to be represented by its head of government. British Prime Minister Gordon Brown did not attend as the summit took place during the 2010 general election campaign in the UK. The summit was instead attended by Foreign Secretary David Miliband.

Country/Organization	Representative
Algeria	Mourad Medelci (Minister of Foreign Affairs)
Argentina	Cristina Fernández de Kirchner (President)
Armenia	Serzh Sargsyan (President)
Australia	John Faulkner (Defence Minister)
Belgium	Yves Leterme (Prime Minister)
Brazil	Luiz Inácio Lula da Silva (President)
Canada	Stephen Harper (Prime Minister)
Chile	Sebastián Piñera (President)
China	Hu Jintao (President)
Czech Republic	Jan Fischer (Prime Minister)
Egypt	Ahmed Aboul Gheit (Foreign Minister)
European Union	Herman Van Rompuy (President of the European Council)
Finland	Tarja Halonen (President)
France	Nicolas Sarkozy (President)
(Georgia (country)) Georgia	Mikheil Saakashvili (President)
Germany	Angela Merkel (Chancellor)
India	Manmohan Singh (Prime Minister)
Indonesia	Boediono (Vice President)
International Atomic Energy Agency	Yukiya Amano (Director-General)
Israel	Dan Meridor (Deputy Prime Minister and Intelligence Services Minister)
Italy	Silvio Berlusconi (Prime Minister)
Japan	Yukio Hatoyama (Prime Minister)
Jordan	Abdullah II (King)
Kazakhstan	Nursultan Nazarbayev (President)
Malaysia	Najib Tun Razak (Prime Minister)
Mexico	Felipe Calderón (President)
Morocco	Abbas El Fassi (Prime Minister)
Netherlands	Jan Peter Balkenende (Demissionary Prime Minister)
New Zealand	John Key (Prime Minister)
Nigeria	Goodluck Jonathan (President - Acting)
Norway	Jens Stoltenberg (Prime Minister)
Pakistan	Yousaf Raza Gillani (Prime Minister)
Philippines	Gloria Macapagal Arroyo (President)
Poland	Radosław Sikorski (Minister of Foreign Affairs)
Russia	Dmitry Medvedev (President)
Saudi Arabia	Muqran bin Abdul Aziz Al Saud (President of the General Intelligence Presidency)
Singapore	Lee Hsien Loong (Prime Minister)
South Africa	Jacob Zuma (President)
South Korea	Lee Myung-bak (President)
Spain	José Luis Rodríguez Zapatero (Prime Minister)
Sweden	Fredrik Reinfeldt (Prime Minister)
Switzerland	Doris Leuthard (President)
Thailand	Trairong Suwankiri (Deputy Prime Minister)
Turkey	Recep Tayyip Erdoğan (Prime Minister)
Ukraine	Viktor Yanukovych (President)
United Arab Emirates	Mohammed bin Zayed Al Nahyan (Crown Prince of Abu Dhabi)
United Kingdom	David Miliband (Secretary of State for Foreign and Commonwealth Affairs)
United Nations	Ban Ki-moon (Secretary-General)
United States (host)	Barack Obama (President)
Vietnam	Nguyễn Tấn Dũng (Prime Minister)

== Schedule and agenda ==
=== April 12 ===
Monday's schedule included the following events:

- United States President Barack Obama holds bilateral meetings with King Abdullah II of Jordan, Prime Minister Najib Tun Razak of Malaysia, President Viktor Yanukovych of Ukraine, President Serzh Sargsyan of Armenia, and President Hu Jintao of China beginning at 10:45 am (EDT)
- Obama welcomes heads of delegation to the Summit at 5:00 pm (EDT)
- Obama holds a working dinner with heads of delegation beginning at 6:30 pm (EDT)

=== April 13 ===
Tuesday's schedule included the following events, many of which were isolated from the news media:

- Leaders gather for a group photo at 9:20 am (EDT)
- United States President Barack Obama opens the second day of the Summit with remarks at Plenary Session I at 9:30 am (EDT)
- Heads of delegation attend a working lunch at 12:00 pm (EDT)
- Obama meets with Prime Minister of Turkey Recep Tayyip Erdoğan at 1:30 pm (EDT)
- Plenary Session II begins at 2:00 pm (EDT)
- Obama meets with President of Argentina Cristina Fernández de Kirchner at 4:00 pm (EDT)
- Obama holds press conference at 4:30 pm (EDT)
- Heads of delegation reception begins at 5:15 pm (EDT)
- Obama meets with Chancellor of Germany Angela Merkel at 6:00 pm (EDT)

== Summit consequences ==
=== Non-binding communiqué ===
A non-binding communiqué issued after the summit recognized nuclear terrorism as "one of the most challenging threats to international security" and saw parties:

1. Reaffirm the fundamental responsibility of States, consistent with their respective international obligations
2. Call on States to work cooperatively as an international community to advance nuclear security
3. Recognize that highly enriched uranium and separated plutonium require special precautions
4. Endeavor to fully implement all existing nuclear security commitments and work toward acceding to those not yet joined
5. Support the objectives of international nuclear security instruments
6. Reaffirm the essential role of the International Atomic Energy Agency in the international nuclear security framework
7. Recognize the role and contributions of the United Nations
8. Acknowledge the need for capacity building for nuclear security and cooperation at bilateral, regional and multilateral levels
9. Recognize the need for cooperation among States to effectively prevent and respond to incidents of illicit nuclear trafficking
10. Recognize the continuing role of nuclear industry in nuclear security
11. Support the implementation of strong nuclear security practices
12. Recognize that measures contributing to nuclear material security have value in relation to the security of radioactive substances

In response to the communiqué offered at the summit, U.S. Senate Republican Jon Kyl said that "the summit's purported accomplishment is a nonbinding communiqué that largely restates current policy, and makes no meaningful progress in dealing with nuclear terrorism threats or the ticking clock represented by Iran's nuclear weapons program." U.S. President Barack Obama said in a news conference after the summit that he was "going to push as hard as I can to make sure that we get strong sanctions that have consequences for Iran as it's making calculations about its nuclear program and that those are done on a timely basis."

=== Other consequences ===
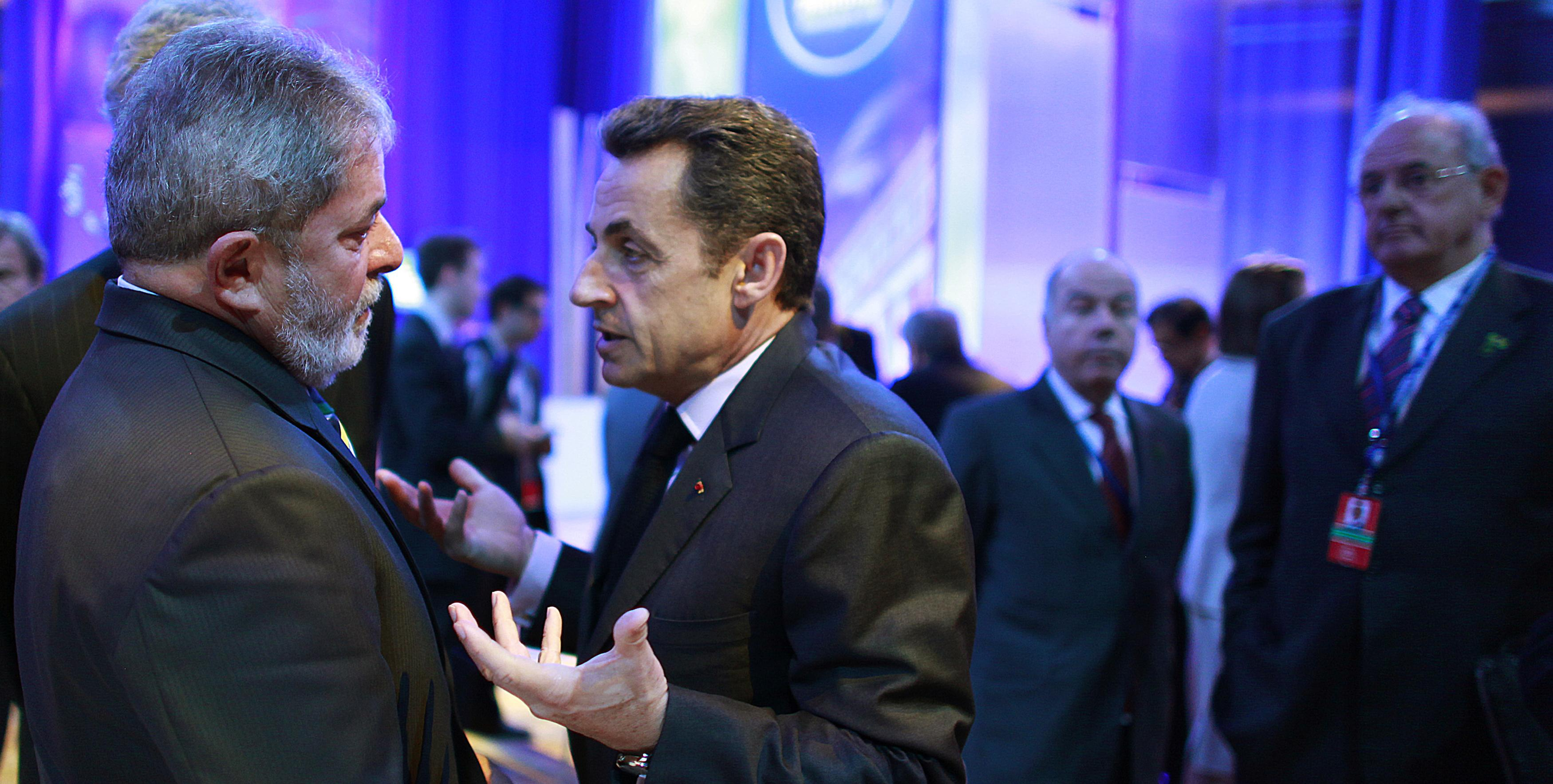
The presidents of Brazil, Lula da Silva, and France, Nicolas Sarkozy. Nelson Jobim, the Brazilian Minister of Defense, is in the background.

The value of informal conversations and discussions is an important aspect of international conferences. Only some lead to directly to an announcement in the summit context.

On the first day of the Summit, Ukraine announced that it would give up its 90-kilogram (200 lb) stock of highly enriched uranium and convert its research reactors from highly enriched to low-enriched uranium. It intends to accomplish these goals by 2012.

The topic of a nuclear fuel bank was briefly discussed by some members attending the conference. President of Kazakhstan Nursultan Nazarbayev sought the United States' backing to house a nuclear fuel bank while he was in Washington for the event and Prime Minister of Pakistan Yousaf Raza Gillani issued a statement saying Pakistan would like to act as a provider and "participate in any non-discriminatory nuclear fuel cycle assurance mechanism". The UAE also reconfirmed its $10 million pledge to the IAEA Nuclear Fuel Bank and its policy of foregoing domestic enrichment and spent fuel reprocessing.

The most widely anticipated meeting during the Summit was the bilateral meeting between Barack Obama and President Hu Jintao of China held on April 12. During the ninety-minute meeting the two leaders discussed global economic rebalancing and Iran's nuclear program. China agreed to work with the United States at the United Nations on a resolution imposing further economic sanctions on Iran. The Chinese Foreign Ministry issued a statement saying sanctions and pressure cannot fundamentally resolve the Iran nuclear issue while reiterating China's adherence to a dual-track strategy. "We support the international nuclear non-proliferation system, maintain the peace and stability in the Middle East, oppose Iran having nuclear weapons and support a dual-track strategy," Foreign Ministry spokesperson Jiang Yu said.

On the second day of the Summit, President Obama announced that the next summit meeting about this subject will be in South Korea — see 2012 Nuclear Security Summit.

Also on the second day of the Summit, Canada, Mexico, and the United States reached an agreement "that will help convert fuel at Mexico's nuclear research reactor to a lower grade of uranium unsuitable for nuclear weapons." The project, which will be overseen by the International Atomic Energy Agency, will eliminate all highly enriched uranium in Mexico.

Russian Foreign Minister Sergey Lavrov and United States Secretary of State Hillary Clinton signed an update to a 2000 agreement calling on each country to dispose of 34 metric tons of weapons-grade plutonium by burning it as fuel in nuclear reactors. Additionally, Russian President Medvedev confirmed plans to close a plutonium production reactor in Zheleznogorsk.

A summit document also highlighted a comprehensive nuclear law passed in March by Egypt to strengthen nuclear security, and funding contributions by several countries to nuclear regulatory agencies and programs.

=== Reaction to the summit ===
The nuclear security summit generated a variety of reactions from media, organizations, and politicians among others. Charles Hanley, who has reported on nuclear arms control for three decades for the Associated Press, commented that "the world took a big step out of the age of MAD and into an even madder age, when a dark vision of random nuclear terror will shadow our days for decades or more to come."

==== Media reactions ====
Jonathan Marcus from the BBC wrote that "the battle to safeguard nuclear materials will be a struggle with small victories in different parts of the world." Judson Berger of Fox News wrote that "the United States rapidly is becoming the hottest destination for unwanted nuclear fuel" which raises concerns about cost, since the U.S. devotes millions of dollars to converting the material. And it could raise questions about security, too. Louis Charbonneau of Reuters commented that the "summit took a step toward lowering the risk of a terrorist group getting an atomic weapon, but real progress depends on countries keeping the promises they made".

==== Organizational reactions ====
Sam Nunn, a former U.S. senator who tutored Mr. Obama on nuclear proliferation issues said he believed "we are now closer to cooperation than catastrophe." Graham Allison, an expert on nuclear terrorism at Harvard University, made the case that if countries "lock down all nuclear weapons and bomb-usable material as securely as gold in Fort Knox, they can reduce the likelihood of a nuclear 9/11 to nearly zero."

Paul Stares, Director of the Center for Preventive Action at the Council on Foreign Relations, wrote "some observers will doubtless pronounce the summit's outcome as modest and, in any case, pre-cooked" but argued that the participation of nations from the developing world was encouraging and that the summit injected important momentum toward the goal of securing all nuclear weapons-usable material within four years. Stares asserted that "patient, incremental steps may not be very exciting, but they can still achieve a lot."

Daryl Kimball, executive director of the Arms Control Association, and Peter Crail, a Nonproliferation Analyst at the Arms Control Association, said "the summit was also able to point out that this risk of nuclear terrorism is a shared one and is not just a threat to the United States". They called on the U.S. to work for a global halt to the production of weapons-usable material, to discourage states from separating plutonium as part of their spent fuel reprocessing program, and for the "U.S. Congress to fully support programs aimed at enhancing nuclear security around the globe and combating illicit nuclear trafficking".

International Atomic Energy Agency Director General Yukiya Amano welcomed the strong support expressed at the summit for the Agency's "essential role" in the field of nuclear security. "I am pleased that the IAEA’s efforts to make nuclear facilities and borders more secure to reduce the threat of nuclear terrorism are recognized at the highest levels of government," he said. Amano further said he was "grateful to all those who have matched their words of support today with much needed pledges to ensure that the IAEA has the resources it needs to make all of us more secure."

Stephen Walt, a professor of international affairs at Harvard University writing for Foreign Policy, said he would give the summit "pretty high marks" for "a lot of useful pre-summit diplomacy" and for its acknowledgement that "the effort to promote greater nuclear security is primarily a political-diplomatic campaign, and one that will require sustained energy and attention". Walt wrote that it was a rare "policy problems that we actually do know how to address", that it was easier and cheaper to address than climate change, and that " there are hardly any counter-arguments against it".

==== U.S. political reactions ====
In response to the summit, U.S. Senate Republican Jon Kyl asserted that "the greatest threat of nuclear proliferation and terrorism comes from Iran" and that "despite the talk at the security summit, it appears we are no closer to tough sanctions or a meaningful Security Council resolution today, seven months after the President said that the regime would face sanctions."

U.S. President Barack Obama said in a news conference after the summit that China had sent official representatives to negotiations in New York to begin the process of drafting a sanctions resolution and that he had told the Chinese President that "words have to mean something, there have to be some consequences". Obama further said "the fact that we've got Russia and China, as well as the other P5-plus-1 members having a serious discussion around a sanctions regime, following up on a serious sanctions regime that was passed when North Korea flouted its obligations towards the NPT, it's a sign of the degree to which international diplomacy is making it more possible for us to isolate those countries that are breaking their international obligations."

U.S. Senator Richard Lugar met with Chilean President Sebastián Piñera and praised the Chilean cooperation with the U.S. to secure and remove 40 pounds (18 kg) of highly enriched uranium in the midst of its earthquake recovery. Lugar also welcomed the announcement by Ukraine to relinquish its highly enriched uranium stockpile. “Combating nuclear terrorism requires that we take every step possible and I hope President Obama’s leadership brings new momentum to this vital mission," Senate Foreign Relations Committee Chairman John Kerry said.

==== International reactions ====
For its part, Iran's envoy to the IAEA denounced the summit, to which it was not invited. The envoy said any action taken at the summit would not be legally binding and that the U.S. could not hold countries not invited to the summit to any thing the summit might agree to. He further argued it was Washington that was "the real threat to international security with its nuclear weapons." Iranian President Mahmoud Ahmadinejad condemned the summit in the U.S. He called the meeting "humiliating to humanity. World summits being organised these days are intended to humiliate human beings. These foolish people who are in charge are like stupid, retarded people who brandish their swords whenever they face shortcomings, without realising that the time for this type of thing is over." Iran was not officially on the summit agenda.

===== Conference convened by Iran =====
Iran organized a two-day nuclear conference which was held a week after this summit, with the theme "Nuclear Energy for All, Nuclear Weapons for None."

At that conference, President Ahmadinejad took issue with the U.S.' establishment of a new policy that did not rule out the use of nuclear weapons against Iran and North Korea, both of which have withdrawn from or violated the terms of the Nuclear Non-Proliferation Treaty and had UN Security Council Resolutions passed against them. Ahmadinejad further called for more rigorous action than that outlined by the above summit. Iranian supreme Leader Ayatollah Ali Khamenei reiterated a religious edict he had issued earlier against the use of all nuclear weapons.

== Security ==
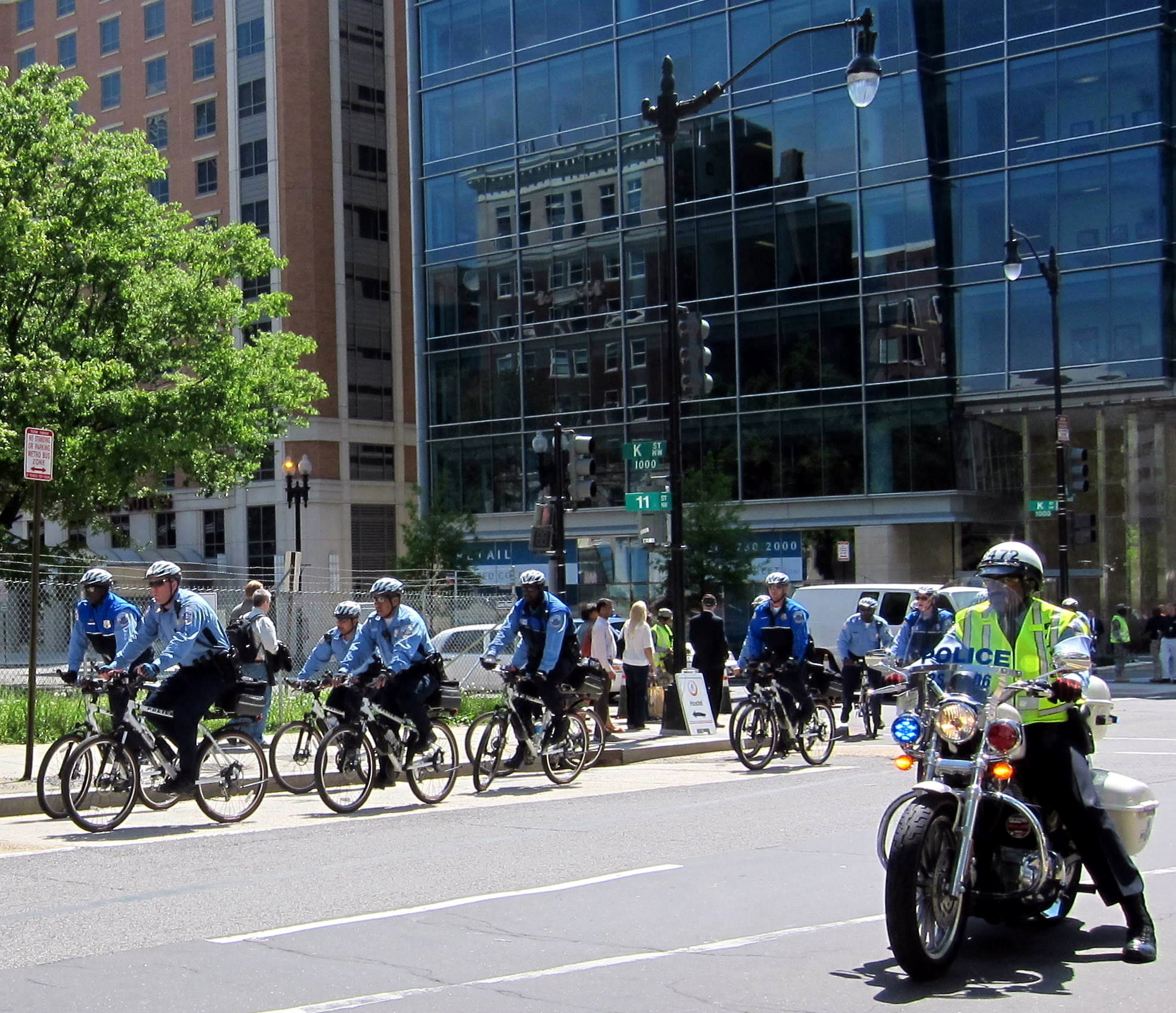
Officers of the D.C. Police Department on patrol during the Nuclear Security Summit.

The Summit was described by The Washington Post as having the greatest concentration of security in Washington since the inauguration of Barack Obama. An area of several city blocks surrounding the Walter E. Washington Convention Center—site of the Summit—was closed to traffic and parking. Thirteen Metrobus lines were rerouted and the Mount Vernon Square station was closed for the duration of the Summit. The Office of Personnel Management urged remote work or flextime by federal employees.

On April 12, a bicyclist identified as 68-year-old Constance Holden was killed when she was struck by a National Guard truck. The truck was moving into position to block the intersection of New York Avenue NW and 12th Street NW for a passing Summit-related motorcade. Holden was a journalist who had worked for the journal Science since 1970; she had just left work at the American Association for the Advancement of Science headquarters before being struck.

== See also ==
- Nuclear Non-Proliferation Treaty
- Barack Obama speech in Prague, 2009
- Global Initiative to Combat Nuclear Terrorism
- Nuclear disarmament
  - New START
- Nuclear proliferation
- Proliferation Security Initiative
