= 2016 Nuclear Security Summit =

- Host country: United States
- Date: March 31 – April 1, 2016
- Cities: Washington, D.C.
- Venues: Walter E. Washington Convention Center
- Participants: 58 representatives
- Follows: 2014 Nuclear Security Summit
- Website: www.nss2016.org

The 2016 Nuclear Security Summit was held on March 31-April 1, 2016, in Washington, D.C., United States. It was the fourth and final summit in a series launched after U.S. President Barack Obama’s 2009 Prague speech calling for global efforts to secure nuclear materials and prevent terrorism.

The summit brought together leaders from nearly 50 countries, the European Union, and international organizations to advance nuclear security by reducing risks that nuclear or radioactive materials could be stolen or misused. Key outcomes included commitments to reduce highly enriched uranium stockpiles, transfer of plutonium to the United States, financial support for nuclear security initiatives, and strengthened safeguards and criminal penalties against nuclear smuggling.

== Background ==
The idea for what became the series of Nuclear Security Summits (NSS) traces back to 2009, when Barack Obama delivered a speech in Prague in which he described nuclear terrorism as "the most immediate and extreme threat to global security." In that speech he proposed a concerted international effort to secure vulnerable nuclear materials worldwide, break up illicit trafficking networks, intercept materials in transit, and use financial and regulatory tools to prevent the proliferation of material usable for weapons.

In response, the first NSS was convened in Washington, D.C., in April 2010. That summit brought together nearly 50 heads of state and government, making it at that time the largest gathering of world leaders since the founding of the United Nations. The goal of the Summits was not to start new treaties, but to build political momentum at the highest level, energize existing international mechanisms, and push for concrete steps to reduce the risk that nuclear-weapon‑usable and other radioactive materials could be stolen, diverted or otherwise fall into the hands of terrorists or non‑state actors.

The 2016 Nuclear Security Summit was held at the Walter E. Washington Convention Center in Washington, D.C., in the United States of America.

== Participants ==
Host nation (United States) Participating nations European Union members represented by the President of the European Council and the President of the European Commission only (as observer)

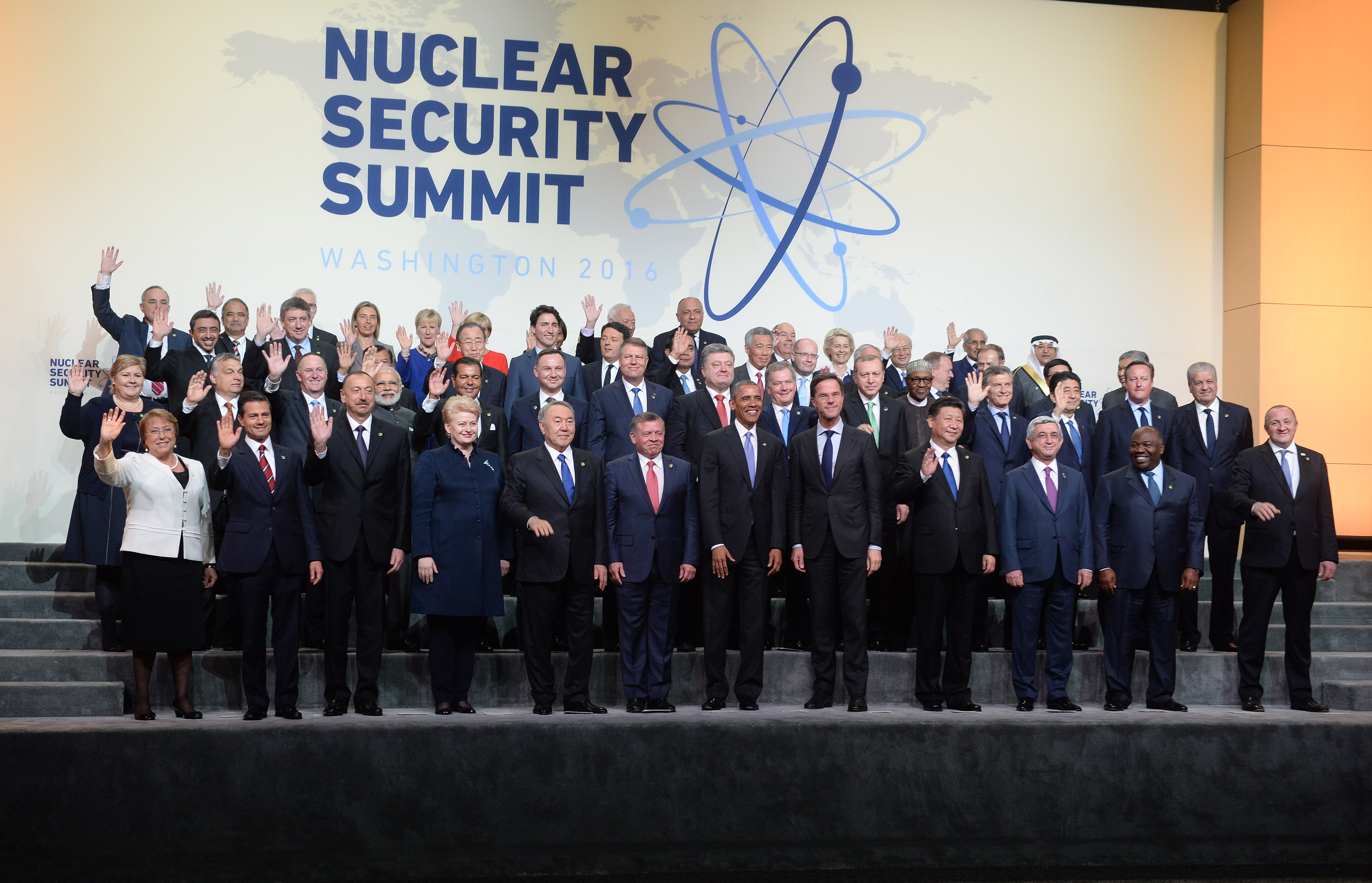
Participating world leaders at the 2016 Nuclear Security Summit

Notably absent from the summit were leaders or representatives of Russia, North Korea, Iran and Belarus. However, a significant contingent of Asian leaders especially from South Asia such as India and Singapore attending the summit was a probable sign of continental concern over terrorist threats alongside vulnerable nuclear facilities.

Country/Organization	Representative(s)
Algeria	Abdelmalek Sellal (Prime Minister)
Argentina	Mauricio Macri (President)
Armenia	Serzh Sargsyan (President)
Australia	Julie Bishop (Minister for Foreign Affairs)
Azerbaijan	Ilham Aliyev (President)
Belgium	Jan Jambon (Deputy Prime Minister and Minister of the Interior)
Brazil	Mauro Vieira (Ministry of Foreign Affairs)
Canada	Justin Trudeau (Prime Minister)
Chile	Michelle Bachelet (President)
China	Xi Jinping (CCP General Secretary and President)
Czech Republic	Bohuslav Sobotka (Prime Minister)
Denmark	Lars Løkke Rasmussen (Prime Minister)
Egypt	Sameh Shoukry (Minister of Foreign Affairs)
European Union	Donald Tusk (President)
European Union	Federica Mogherini (High Representative of the Union for Foreign Affairs and Security Policy)
Finland	Sauli Niinistö (President)
France	François Hollande (President)
Gabon	Ali Bongo Ondimba (President)
Georgia	Giorgi Margvelashvili (President)
Germany	Ursula von der Leyen (Minister of Defence)
Hungary	Viktor Orbán (Prime Minister)
India	Narendra Modi (Prime Minister)
Indonesia	Jusuf Kalla (Vice President)
International Atomic Energy Agency (observer)	Yukiya Amano (Director General)
Interpol (observer)	Jürgen Stock (Secretary General)
Israel	Yuval Steinitz (Ministry of National Infrastructures, Energy and Water Resources)
Italy	Matteo Renzi (Prime Minister)
Japan	Shinzō Abe (Prime Minister)
Jordan	Abdullah II bin Al-Hussein (King)
Kazakhstan	Nursultan Nazarbayev (President)
Lithuania	Dalia Grybauskaitė (President)
Malaysia	Ahmad Hamidi Zahid (Deputy Prime Minister)
Mexico	Enrique Peña Nieto (President)
Morocco	Moulay Rachid (Prince)
Netherlands	Mark Rutte (Prime Minister)
New Zealand	John Key (Prime Minister)
Nigeria	Muhammadu Buhari (President)
Norway	Erna Solberg (Prime Minister)
Pakistan	Tariq Fatemi (Assistant to Prime Minister of Pakistan)
Philippines	Mario Montejo (Secretary of Science and Technology)
Poland	Andrzej Duda (President)
Romania	Klaus Iohannis (President)
Saudi Arabia	Hashim A. Yamani (President of King Abdullah City for Atomic and Renewable Energy)
Singapore	Lee Hsien Loong (Prime Minister)
South Africa	Maite Nkoana-Mashabane (Minister of International Relations and Cooperation)
South Korea	Park Geun-hye (President)
Spain	José Manuel García-Margallo (Minister of Foreign Affairs and Cooperation)
Sweden	Margot Wallström (Minister of Foreign Affairs)
Switzerland	Johann Schneider-Ammann (President)
Thailand	Prayut Chan-o-cha (Prime Minister)
Turkey	Recep Tayyip Erdoğan (President)
Ukraine	Petro Poroshenko (President)
United Arab Emirates	Abdullah Bin Zayed Al Nahyan (Minister of Foreign Affairs)
United Kingdom	David Cameron (Prime Minister)
United Nations (observer)	Ban Ki-moon (Secretary-General)
United States (host)	Barack Obama (President)
Vietnam	Pham Binh Minh (Deputy Prime Minister and Minister of Foreign Affairs)

== Announcements ==
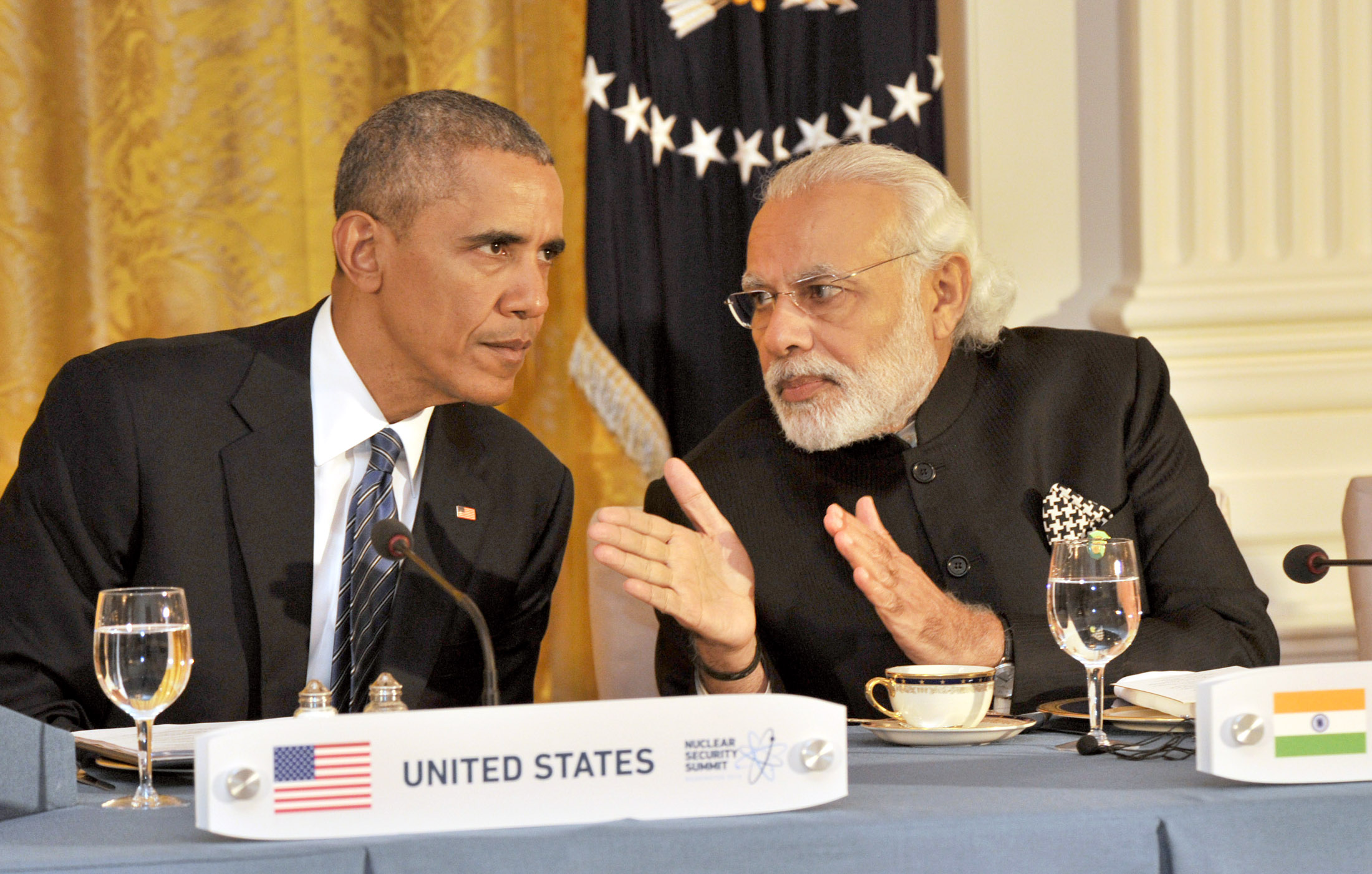
Modi and Obama at the summit.

Various countries, including Kazakhstan and Poland, undertook to reduce their highly enriched uranium stockpiles. Japan agreed to ship additional separated plutonium to the U.S. Canada pledged $42 million to bolster nuclear security. The U.S. disclosed its own inventory of highly enriched uranium has dropped from 741 metric tons in the 1990s to 586 metric tons as of 2013. A strengthened nuclear security agreement, which had languished since 2005, was finally approved, extending safeguards for nuclear materials and requiring criminal penalties for nuclear smuggling. According to the U.S., since the last summit in 2014, ten nations have removed or disposed of about 450 kilograms of highly enriched uranium; Argentina, Switzerland and Uzbekistan are now free of highly enriched uranium, as is all of Latin America and the Caribbean.

The summit participants stated that the 2016 summit would be "the last of this kind".

Three months after the meeting, NPCIL and Westinghouse agreed to conclude contractual arrangements for 6 reactors by June 2017.

== See also ==
- Southeast Asian Nuclear-Weapon-Free Zone Treaty
- Nuclear disarmament
