= List of weapons of mass destruction treaties =

A variety of treaties and agreements have been enacted to regulate the use, development and possession of various types of weapons of mass destruction (WMD). Treaties may regulate weapons use under the customs of war (Hague Conventions, Geneva Protocol), ban specific types of weapons (Chemical Weapons Convention, Biological Weapons Convention), limit weapons research (Partial Test Ban Treaty, Comprehensive Nuclear-Test-Ban Treaty), limit allowable weapons stockpiles and delivery systems (START I, SORT) or regulate civilian use of weapon precursors (Chemical Weapons Convention, Biological Weapons Convention). The history of weapons control has also included treaties to limit effective defense against weapons of mass destruction in order to preserve the deterrent doctrine of mutual assured destruction (Anti-Ballistic Missile Treaty) as well as treaties to limit the spread of nuclear technologies geographically (African Nuclear Weapons Free Zone Treaty, Nuclear Non-Proliferation Treaty).

There is a separate list of states parties to several of the major weapons of mass destruction treaties.

== General ==
* Year of entry into force in parentheses

- Protocol I (1977) and Protocol II (1977) of the Geneva Conventions (1949)
- Environmental Modification Convention (1978) (list of states parties)

== Delivery systems ==
- International Code of Conduct against Ballistic Missile Proliferation (2002, not a treaty)

== Biological weapons ==
Agreement	Date signed	Date of entry into force	Number of states parties	Objective
Geneva Protocol	17 June 1925	8 February 1928	146	Ban the use of chemical and biological weapons
Biological and Toxin Weapons Convention (BWC)	10 April 1972	26 March 1975	187 (list)	Comprehensively ban biological weapons
United Nations Security Council Resolution 1540	NA	28 April 2004	NA	Prevent WMD proliferation, especially to non-state actors

== Chemical weapons ==
Agreement	Date signed	Date of entry into force	States parties	Objective
Strasbourg Agreement		27 August 1675	France and the Holy Roman Empire	Ban the use of poison bullets
Treaty of Versailles		10 January 1920	Germany and the Allied Powers of WWI	Ban Germany from manufacturing or stockpiling chemical weapons (among many things)
Geneva Protocol	17 June 1925	8 February 1928	146	Ban the use of chemical and biological weapons against enemy nationals in international armed conflict
Chemical Weapons Convention (CWC)	3 September 1992	29 April 1997	193 (list)	Comprehensively ban chemical weapons

== Nuclear weapons ==
=== Disarmament and non-proliferation ===
Agreement	Date signed	Date of entry into force	Number of states parties	Objective
Statute of the International Atomic Energy Agency		29 July 1957	178 (list)	
Outer Space Treaty	27 January 1967	10 October 1967	115 (list)	Ban stationing of WMD in space
Nuclear Non-Proliferation Treaty (NPT)	1 July 1968	5 March 1970	191 (list)	1. prevent nuclear proliferation; 2. promote nuclear disarmament; 3. promote peaceful uses of nuclear energy
Seabed Arms Control Treaty	11 February 1971	18 May 1972	94	Ban stationing of WMD on the ocean floor
Convention on the Physical Protection of Nuclear Material	3 March 1980	8 February 1987	164	Ensure the physical protection of nuclear material and nuclear facilities
Treaty on the Prohibition of Nuclear Weapons (TPNW) (2021)	20 September 2017	22 January 2021	70 (list)	Comprehensively ban nuclear weapons

== Regional restrictions ==
Agreement	Date signed	Date of entry into force	Number of states parties
Antarctic Treaty	December 1, 1959	June 23, 1961	55
Treaty for the Prohibition of Nuclear Weapons in Latin America and the Caribbean	14 February 1967	22 April 1968	33
South Atlantic Peace and Cooperation Zone	NA	27 October 1986	24
South Pacific Nuclear Free Zone Treaty	6 August 1985	11 December 1986	13
Treaty on the Final Settlement with Respect to Germany	12 September 1990	15 March 1991	6
Southeast Asian Nuclear-Weapon-Free Zone Treaty	15 December 1995	28 March 1997	10
India–United States Civil Nuclear Agreement			US and India
African Nuclear-Weapon-Free Zone Treaty	1996	15 July 2009	43
Central Asian Nuclear-Weapon-Free Zone	8 September 2006	21 March 2009	5

=== Weapons limitation ===
Agreement	Date signed	Date of entry into force	Number of states parties	Objective
McCloy–Zorin Accords		20 December 1961		Establish a foundation for all future international (nuclear) disarmament negotiations
Partial Nuclear Test Ban Treaty	5 August 1963	10 October 1963	126 (list)	Ban all nuclear weapons tests except for those conducted underground
Anti-Ballistic Missile Treaty	26 May 1972	1972 (US withdrawal: 2002)	US and USSR	Limit anti-ballistic missile (ABM) systems used in defending areas against ballistic missile-delivered nuclear weapons
Threshold Test Ban Treaty	3 July 1974	11 December 1990	US and USSR	Ban nuclear tests of devices having a yield exceeding 150 kilotons
Comprehensive Nuclear-Test-Ban Treaty (CTBT)	10 September 1996	Not in force	176 (list)	Ban all nuclear weapons tests
Fissile Material Cut-off Treaty	NA	NA	NA	Prohibit the further production of fissile material
Intermediate-Range Nuclear Forces Treaty	8 December 1987	1 June 1988 (expiration: 2 August 2019)	US and USSR	Ban land-based ballistic missiles, cruise missiles, and missile launchers with ranges between 500 and 5,500 km
SALT I (Strategic Arms Limitation Talks)	26 May 1972		US and USSR	Limit the number of strategic ballistic missile launchers
SALT II	June 18 1979	Never entered into force	US and USSR	Limit the number of strategic ballistic missile launchers
START I (Strategic Arms Reduction Treaty)	31 July 1991	5 December 1994	US and USSR	Limit the number of deployed nuclear warheads to 6,000 and of intercontinental ballistic missiles (ICBMs) to 1,600
START II	3 January 1993	14 April 2000 (USSR withdrawal: 14 June 2002)	US and Russia	Ban the use of multiple independently targetable re-entry vehicles (MIRVs) on ICBMs
START III	not completed	NA	US and Russia	Limit the number of deployed strategic nuclear warheads
Strategic Offensive Reductions Treaty (SORT)	24 May 2002	1 June 2003 (expiration: 5 February 2011)	US and Russia	Limit the number of deployed strategic nuclear warheads to between 1,700 and 2,200
New START	8 April 2010	5 February 2011	US and Russia	Limit the number of deployed strategic nuclear warheads to 1,550, deployed missiles and bombers to 700, and deployed and non-deployed launchers (missile tubes and bombers) to 800

=== Cooperation ===
Agreement	Date signed	Date of entry into force	States parties	Objective
Quebec Agreement	19 August 1943	19 August 1943 (expiration: 7 January 1948)	UK and US	Cooperation on nuclear energy and nuclear weapons
1958 US–UK Mutual Defence Agreement	3 July 1958	4 August 1958	UK and US	Exchange of nuclear materials, technology and information
Nassau Agreement	1962		UK and US	Supply of UK with Polaris missiles, launch tubes, and the fire control system (see UK Polaris programme)
Polaris Sales Agreement	6 April 1963		UK and US	Implementation of the Nassau Agreement
Nuclear Terrorism Convention	14 September 2005	7 July 2007	120	Criminalize acts of nuclear terrorism and promote police and judicial cooperation

== See also ==
- Arms control
- List of parties to weapons of mass destruction treaties
- Nuclear arms race
- Nuclear-free zone
- Nuclear proliferation
- Nuclear weapon
- Nuclear warfare
- Nuclear-weapon-free zone
- International Atomic Energy Agency
- Organisation for the Prohibition of Chemical Weapons
- General Purpose Criterion
