= List of nuclear technology treaties =

This is a list of treaties that address issues of nuclear technology, including nuclear weapons, their delivery systems, and nuclear energy. The date is given for the signature of each treaty, not its entry into force. This does not include non-treaties such as secret agreements.

== Nuclear weapons ==
=== Arms limitation ===
- 1968, multilateral: Outer Space Treaty - banned stationing nuclear weapons in space
- 1971, multilateral: Seabed Arms Control Treaty - banned nuclear weapons on international ocean floor
- 1972, US-USSR: Anti-Ballistic Missile Treaty - limited parties to two ABM complexes of 100 missiles each
- 1987, US-USSR: Intermediate-Range Nuclear Forces Treaty - banned ground-launched ballistic and cruise missiles with ranges 500–5,500 km
- 1990, multilateral: Treaty on the Final Settlement with Respect to Germany - banned nuclear weapons stationing in the new states of Germany
- 1991, US-USSR: START I - limited party deployed warheads to 6,000 and ICBM plus bomber total to 1,600
- 1992, US-Russia-Belarus-Kazakhstan-Ukraine: Lisbon Protocol - bound all states to START I and committed Belarus, Kazakhstan, and Ukraine to join the Non-Proliferation Treaty
- 1993, US-Russia: START II - banned MIRVs
- proposed, US-Russia: START III - would have limited party deployed warheads to 2,500, 2,000, or 1,500
- 2002, US-Russia: Strategic Offensive Reductions Treaty - limited party deployed warheads to 2,200
- 2010, US-Russia: New START - limited party deployed strategic warheads to 1,550
- 2017, multilateral: Treaty on the Prohibition of Nuclear Weapons - banned all nuclear weapons for parties

=== Testing ===
- 1963, multilateral: Partial Nuclear Test Ban Treaty - banned non-underground nuclear tests
- 1974, US-USSR: Threshold Test Ban Treaty - banned nuclear weapons tests over 150 kt
- 1976, US-USSR: Peaceful Nuclear Explosions Treaty - banned peaceful nuclear explosions over 150 kt
- 1996, multilateral: Comprehensive Nuclear-Test-Ban Treaty - banned all types of nuclear tests

=== Nuclear weapon-free zones ===
- 1959, multilateral: Antarctic Treaty System
- 1967, multilateral: Treaty for the Prohibition of Nuclear Weapons in Latin America and the Caribbean (Treaty of Tlatelolco)
- 1985, multilateral: South Pacific Nuclear-Free Zone Treaty (Treaty of Rarotonga)
- 1995, multilateral: Southeast Asian Nuclear-Weapon-Free Zone Treaty (Bangkok Treaty)
- 1996, multilateral: African Nuclear-Weapon-Free Zone Treaty (Treaty of Pelindaba)
- 1998, multilateral: Mongolian Nuclear-Weapons-Free Status
- 2006, multilateral: Central Asian Nuclear Weapon Free Zone (Treaty of Semipalatinsk)

== Nuclear energy ==
- 1968, multilateral: Treaty on the Non-Proliferation of Nuclear Weapons - banned pursuit of nuclear weapons by parties
- 1994, US-DPRK: Agreed Framework - froze North Korea's nuclear program and began KEDO civil nuclear cooperation
- 2005, US-India: India–United States Civil Nuclear Agreement - established IAEA safeguards on civil nuclear facilities in India and began US civil nuclear cooperation
- 2009, France-Pakistan: France–Pakistan Atomic Energy Framework - established IAEA safeguards on civil nuclear facilities in Pakistan
- 2009, US-UAE: U.S.–UAE 123 Agreement for Peaceful Civilian Nuclear Energy Cooperation
- 2015, multilateral: Joint Comprehensive Plan of Action - limited Iran's civil nuclear program in return for nuclear-related sanction relief

== Other ==
- 1992, multilateral: Treaty on Open Skies - allowed for aerial surveillance flights

== Proposed ==
- 1979, multilateral: Treaty on the Prohibition of the Development, Manufacture, Stockpiling and Use of Radiological Weapons - would ban radiological weapons, drafted by Conference on Disarmament.
- 1994, P5 states: Draft Treaty on No-First Use of Nuclear Weapons - would commit the five NPT-recognized nuclear-weapon states to not use any form of nuclear weapon first strike, submitted by China.

== See also ==
- List of nuclear weapons
- List of nuclear weapons tests
- Timeline of nuclear weapons development
- Timeline of nuclear power
- Timeline of nuclear fusion
