= IAEA safeguards =

Nuclear material inspection regime

Map of IAEA Safeguards Agreements: Voluntary Offer Safeguards with Nonproliferation Treaty Nuclear-Weapon States CSA in force CSA signed / Item-Specific Safeguards in force (Israel, India, Pakistan) Noncompliant with CSA in force (North Korea) Partially recognized state with CSA in force (Taiwan)

International Atomic Energy Agency (IAEA) Safeguards are a system of inspection and verification of the peaceful uses of nuclear materials, primarily as part of the Nuclear Non-Proliferation Treaty (NPT), supervised by the International Atomic Energy Agency.

== Department of Safeguards ==
Safeguards activities are undertaken by the Department of Safeguards, a separate department within the International Atomic Energy Agency. The department is headed by Deputy Director General and Head of the Department of Safeguards Massimo Aparo. The mission statement of the Department of Safeguards is: "The primary role of the [Safeguards] Department is to administer and implement IAEA safeguards. It also contributes to nuclear arms control and disarmament, by responding to requests for verification and technical assistance associated with related agreements and arrangements." The department is organized into operations divisions, which include the inspectors that conduct safeguards inspections in the IAEA's member states to confirm that they are living up to their NPT commitments, and support divisions, that provide the tools and services for the safeguards inspectors to complete their mission. Safeguards inspections compare a state's nuclear program, as declared to the IAEA, to observed nuclear activities in the country. The Divisions of Operations are organized as follows:

• Operations A: conducting safeguards inspections in East Asia and Australasia
• Operations B: conducting safeguards inspections in the Middle East (Southwest Asia), South Asia, Africa and the Americas; this geographic region also includes non-EU European states
• Operations C: conducting safeguards inspection in the European Union states, Russia and Central Asia
• Operations for verification in Iran (as stated in the 2015 Joint Comprehensive Plan of Action, known commonly as the Iranian Nuclear Deal)

== History ==
The history of the IAEA safeguards begins at the foreground of the nuclear regime to which debate over the disposal of leftover fissile material was the primary concern. Dwight Eisenhower's Atoms for Peace speech in 1953 was the first step towards establishing regulation of nuclear activity to ensure only peaceful purposes were driving scientific development. It proposed that states with leftover fissile material contribute to an international fuel bank. The IAEA was proposed in 1954 with the mission to control the distribution and disposal of used nuclear material. Negotiations of safeguards were controversial due to the idea that they would inhibit the promotion of nuclear energy. However, safeguards help solidify the line between using nuclear energy for peaceful purposes and creating weapons-grade material that could serve militant purposes. Though safeguards are only one part of the nuclear non-proliferation regime, they underpin inspection and verification, and provide assurance that proliferation is not occurring in states declared to be nuclear weaponized, as well as non-nuclear weapons states.

== Treaties and agreements ==
=== Legal framework ===
Status of IAEA Additional Protocol: Additional Protocols in force with Nonproliferation Treaty Nuclear-Weapon States Additional Protocol in force Additional Protocol signed / Additional Protocol with Item-Specific Safeguards in force (India) Partially recognized state with Additional Protocol in force (Taiwan)

International Atomic Energy Agency (IAEA) Safeguards are a system of inspection and verification of the peaceful uses of nuclear materials as part of the Nuclear Non-Proliferation Treaty (NPT), supervised by the International Atomic Energy Agency. Information Circular 66 (INFCIRC 66) is an agreement between the IAEA and member states that provides for the conduct of limited safeguards within the member state. The member states identifies facilities that are made available for inspection.

The Treaty on the Nonproliferation of Nuclear Weapons (NPT) opened for signature in 1968 and entered into force in 1970. The NPT defines nuclear-weapon states as the United States of America, the United Kingdom of Great Britain and Northern Ireland, the People's Republic of China, the Russian Federation, and France. The treaty requires signatories to become members of the IAEA. Nuclear weapons states are responsible for working toward disarmament and non-nuclear weapons states must submit to IAEA safeguards. The treaty requires that non-nuclear weapons states conclude comprehensive safeguards agreements under INFCIRC 153. The NPT is the centerpiece of global efforts to prevent the further spread of nuclear weapons.

=== Additional Protocol ===
In 1993 a program was initiated to strengthen and extend the classical safeguards system, and a model protocol was agreed by the IAEA Board of Governors 1997. The measures boosted the IAEA's ability to detect undeclared nuclear activities, including those with no connection to the civil fuel cycle.

Innovations were of two kinds. Some could be implemented on the basis of IAEA's existing legal authority through safeguards agreements and inspections. Others required further legal authority to be conferred through an Additional Protocol. This must be agreed by each non-weapons state with IAEA, as a supplement to any existing comprehensive safeguards agreement. Weapons states have agreed to accept the principles of the model additional protocol.

Key elements of the model Additional Protocol:

- The IAEA is to be given considerably more information on nuclear and nuclear-related activities, including R & D, production of uranium and thorium (regardless of whether it is traded), and nuclear-related imports and exports.
- IAEA inspectors will have greater rights of access. This will include any suspect location, it can be at short notice (e.g., two hours), and the IAEA can deploy environmental sampling and remote monitoring techniques to detect illicit activities.
- States must streamline administrative procedures so that IAEA inspectors get automatic visa renewal and can communicate more readily with IAEA headquarters.
- Further evolution of safeguards is towards evaluation of each state, taking account of its particular situation and the kind of nuclear materials it has. This will involve greater judgement on the part of IAEA and the development of effective methodologies which reassure NPT States.

As of 31 December 2025, 144 countries have Additional Protocols in force. The IAEA is also applying the measures of the Additional Protocol in Taiwan.

== Safeguards in practice ==
=== Job of a Safeguards Inspector ===
Safeguards inspectors are first appointed by the IAEA's Director General, then approved by the Board of Governors, designated by the State, and granted privileges and immunities by the member states in which they designated to perform inspections. Inspectors are responsible for conducting in-field verification activities at nuclear facilities or locations outside facilities. The general objective of an inspection is to verify that the nuclear material declared and safeguarded at the facility is used only for peaceful nuclear activities and that it is accounted for. Verification activities are performed in different types of inspector access: design information verification (DIV), ad hoc inspections, routine inspections, and complementary access (CA) .

- DIV entails confirmation of design features of a facility and verification of the design features to be accurate and still valid. This activity is performed under a comprehensive safeguards agreement , by which all signatories adhere to the provision and regulation of safeguards.
- The second inspector access provided for by comprehensive safeguards agreements is the inspection, including ad hoc and routine inspections, the objectives of which typically are to verify that nuclear material is not diverted and facilities are not misused to make undeclared nuclear material, including through physical inventory verification (PIV) and interim inventory verification (IIV).
- Complementary access is performed only if an Additional Protocol to the safeguards agreement is in place. The objectives of CA may be to confirm the absence of undeclared nuclear activities/material, answer questions, resolve inconsistencies, or to confirm decommissioned status.

=== Implementation ===
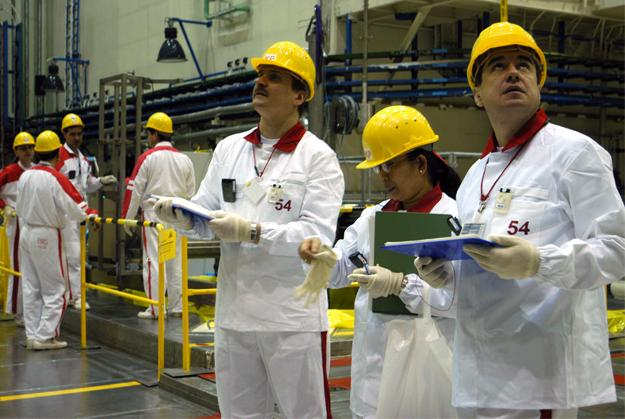
Safeguards Inspection of a Nuclear Power Plant

Safeguards are implemented on an annual cycle and include four fundamental processes:

1. collection and evaluation of all safeguards-relevant information,
2. development of a State-specific safeguards approach,
3. planning, conduct, and evaluation of safeguards activities, and
4. drawing of safeguards conclusions.

The IAEA prepares a Safeguards Implementation Report (SIR) for each country and draws safeguards conclusions based on the information collected during inspections and through remote monitoring and information collection. Safeguards conclusions provide the international community assurance that States are complying with their agreements by following the safeguards obligations. In some cases, the conclusion is that safeguards were not conclusive. Safeguards conclusions are documented in the annual Safeguards Implementation Report which is presented to the Board of Governors at its June meeting.

=== Assistance for states ===
The IAEA offers several useful services to member states including aide for officiating required documentation and assistance with safeguards measures.

== Timeline ==
Timeline of Dates Significant to IAEA Safeguards
Year	Month	Event
1946		Acheson-Lilienthal Report and Baruch Plan propose safeguards as part of international control of atomic energy
1953	December	Eisenhower's Atoms for Peace Speech
1954		IAEA Proposed
1955-56		Negotiation of IAEA Statute
1957		IAEA Statute enters into force, establishes IAEA to promote peaceful uses of nuclear energy The first IAEA General Conference in Vienna
1958		Petition by Linus Pauling to UN that urged for International Agreement to cease nuclear bomb testing Rome Treaty of EURATOM
1961	September	US and Soviet Union sign Joint Statement of Agreed Principles for Disarmament Negotiation, or McCloy-Zorin Accords
1961	December	United Nations General Assembly adopts McCloy-Zorin Accords
1961		The first IAEA Seibersdorf Laboratories open INFCIRC/26 establishes first IAEA safeguards system
1965		INFCIRC/66 establishes revised IAEA safeguards system
1967		Treaty of Tlatelolco establishes nuclear-weapon-free zone in Latin America and the Caribbean INFCIRC/66/Rev.1
1968		The Nuclear Non-Proliferation Treaty (NPT) is signed in Washington, Moscow, and London INFCIRC/66/Rev.2
1970	March	NPT enters into force
1971		Comprehensive Safeguards (INFCIRC/153) are established
1975		Nuclear Suppliers Group (NSG) established
1980		Convention on Physical Protection of Nuclear Materials is signed in New York
1981		US ratifies Additional Protocol I to Treaty of Tlateloclo which submitted US territories in Latin America to nuclear-weapons-free-zones
1986		Treaty of Rarotonga establishes nuclear-weapon-free zone in South Pacific
1990		South Africa begins deconstruction of 6 nuclear weapons
1991		Iraq Action Team is created to implement nuclear inspections within the country Iraq found in non-compliance with IAEA safeguards agreement
1992		North Korea concludes IAEA comprehensive safeguards agreement, six years after acceding to the NPT. Inconsistencies with declared materials in North Korea initiated the IAEA to act and demand verification at facilities, but North Korea denied access.
1993		North Korea announces withdrawal from the NPT but "suspends" withdrawal notification one day before it would have become effective The IAEA reports DPRK non-compliance with its safeguards agreements and verification of nuclear material being used for only peaceful purposes cannot be confirmed
1994		The DPRK withdraws its IAEA membership
1997		INFCIRC/540 (Model Additional Protocol) adopted Treaty of Bangkok establishes nuclear-weapon-free zone in Southeast Asia
2005		IAEA Board of Governors finds Iran in non-compliance with its safeguards agreement for undeclared nuclear fuel cycle activities
2009		Treaty of Pelindaba establishes nuclear-weapon-free zone in Africa Central Asian Nuclear Weapon Free Zone enters into force
2011		IAEA Board of Governors finds Syria in non-compliance with its safeguards agreement for construction of an undeclared plutonium production reactor
2015		Joint Comprehensive Plan of Action (JCPOA) was signed by the US, Russian Federation, China, the UK, France and Germany with the Islamic Republic of Iran to provide assurances that Iran's nuclear program remained solely peaceful.
2021		Treaty on the Prohibition of Nuclear Weapons enters into force

== See also ==
- Nuclear safeguards
- African Nuclear-Weapon-Free Zone Treaty
- Central Asian Nuclear Weapon Free Zone
- Southeast Asian Nuclear-Weapon-Free Zone Treaty
- Treaty of Rarotonga
- Treaty of Tlatelolco
