= Nuclear-free zone =

Area in which nuclear weapons and power plants are banned

A nuclear-free zone is an area in which nuclear weapons and/or nuclear power plants are banned. The specific ramifications of these depend on the locale in question, but are generally distinct from nuclear-weapon-free zones, in that the latter only bans nuclear weapons but may permit nuclear power.

Nuclear-free zones usually neither address nor prohibit radiopharmaceuticals used in nuclear medicine even though many of them are produced in nuclear reactors. They typically do not prohibit other nuclear technologies such as cyclotrons used in particle physics.

Several sub-national authorities worldwide have declared themselves "nuclear-free". However, the label is often symbolic, as nuclear policy is usually determined and regulated at higher levels of government: nuclear weapons and components may traverse nuclear-free zones via military transport without the knowledge or consent of local authorities which had declared nuclear-free zones.

Palau became the first nuclear-free nation in 1980. New Zealand was the first Western-allied nation to legislate towards a national nuclear free zone by effectively renouncing the nuclear deterrent.

== Nuclear-free zone by geographical areas ==
=== Antarctica ===
The Antarctic Treaty System banned military activity on the continent, effective in 1961, and suspended territorial claims. A nuclear reactor provided electricity for McMurdo Station, operated by the United States in the New Zealand Antarctic Territory from 1962 to 1972.

=== Australia ===
Many Australian local government areas of Australia have passed anti-nuclear weaponry legislation; notable among these are Brisbane, capital of Queensland, which has been nuclear weapon free since 1983, and the South and North Sydney councils. Fremantle in Western Australia was the first council to declare itself a nuclear free zone in 1980. The continuing presence of nuclear armed and powered warships in the city's port led to many protests during the 1980s and 1990s. However the passage of such legislation is generally considered just a symbolic measure. The majority of councils which have passed anti-nuclear weaponry legislation are members of the Australian Nuclear Free Zones and Toxic Industries Secretariat which has 44 member councils.

In 1998, the Australian Radiation Protection and Nuclear Safety Act outlawed all construction and operation of nuclear power plants, nuclear fuel fabrication plants, and all other nuclear power in all Australian states and territories. All nuclear power concerns in Australia are handled by the Australian Radiation Protection and Nuclear Safety Agency.

=== Austria ===
Austria is a nuclear free zone, when a nuclear power station was built during the 1970s at Zwentendorf, Austria, start-up was prevented by a popular vote in 1978. The completed power plant is now marketed as a shooting location for film and television. On 9 July 1997, the Austrian Parliament voted unanimously to maintain the country's anti-nuclear policy.

Ironically, the headquarters of the International Atomic Energy Agency is located in Vienna, and the IAEA maintains nuclear laboratories both in Vienna and Seibersdorf. The IAEA has also established programs to assist nuclear energy projects in developing countries.

Austria's anti-nuclear stance also causes tension with its nuclear neighbors. Vienna is located close to the Czech reactor at Temelin, and four reactors are being built in neighboring Slovakia and two in neighboring Hungary.

=== Canada ===
The province of British Columbia also bans mining for uranium, and the construction of nuclear power plants within its territorial limits.

=== Former Soviet Union ===
==== Central Asia ====
All five former Soviet states of Central Asia are parties to the Treaty on the Non-Proliferation of Nuclear Weapons and the Central Asian Nuclear Weapon Free Zone treaty, which came into force on 21 March 2009.

Several Central Asian states have civil nuclear activities, including uranium mining and milling and research reactors, but none have uranium enrichment or spent fuel reprocessing facilities needed to produce weapon-usable nuclear material.

Uzbekistan has begun preparations to begin construction of its first nuclear power plant. In 2022, Kyrgyzstan announced it would work together with Russia in order to build a small nuclear plant.

Kazakhstan is planning to reintroduce nuclear power to decrease its reliance on fossil fuels. The 2019 proposal by President Tokayev was backed at the 2024 Kazakh nuclear power referendum, with 73% voting for the construction of a nuclear power plant. Kazakhstan is also the biggest producer of uranium in the world.

=== Japan ===
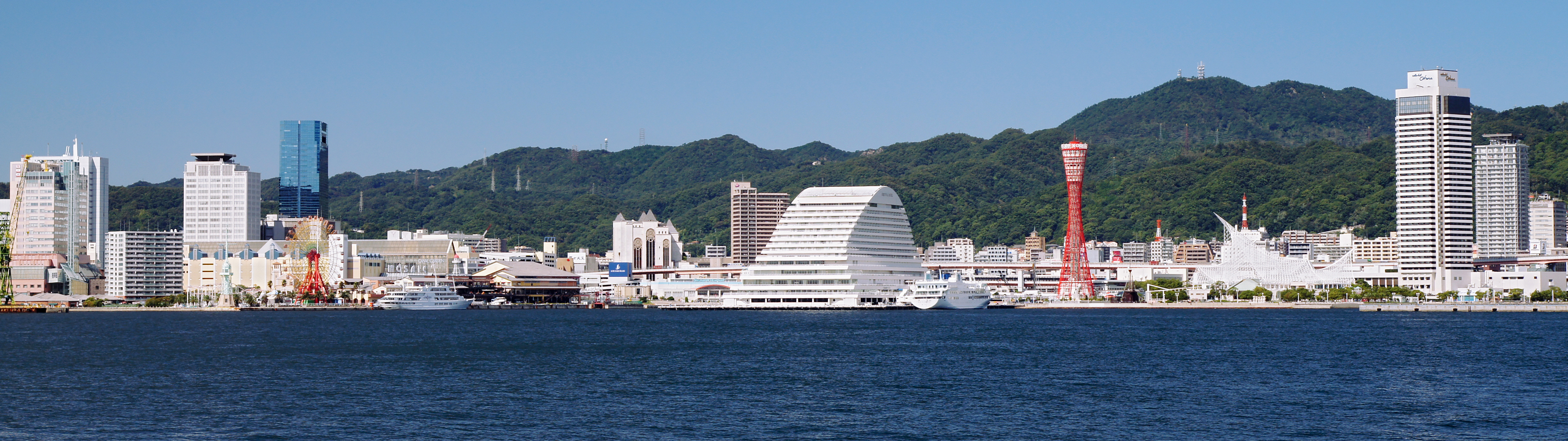
Nuclear-free Kobe Port, seen from Po-ai Shiosai Park in 2011

As a resource-poor nation, Japan is heavily reliant on nuclear power, but its unique experience in World War II has led to the wholesale rejection of nuclear weapons, holding nuclear weapons shall not be manufactured in, possessed by, or allowed entry into Japan. These tenets, known as the Three Non-Nuclear Principles, were first stated by Prime Minister Eisaku Satō in 1967, and were adopted as a parliamentary resolution in 1971, though they have never formally been entered into law. They continue to reflect the attitudes of both government and the general public, who remain staunchly opposed to the manufacture or use of nuclear weapons.

The Japan Self-Defense Forces have never made any attempt to manufacture or otherwise obtain nuclear arms, and no nuclear weapons are known to have been introduced into the Japanese Home Islands since the end of World War II. While the United States does not maintain nuclear bases within its military installations on the Home Islands, it is believed to have once stored weapons at Okinawa, which remained under US administrative jurisdiction until 1972.

=== Italy ===
Italy is a nuclear power free zone since the Italian nuclear power referendum of November 1987. Following center-right parties' victory in the 2008 election, Italy's industry minister announced that the government scheduled the construction to start the first new Italian nuclear-powered plant by 2013. The announced project was paused in March 2011, after the Japanese earthquake and subsequent meltdown of the Fukushima Daiichi Nuclear Power Plant, and scrapped after a referendum on 12–13 June 2011.

However, Italy is also involved in NATO's nuclear sharing policy, hosting US nuclear weapons at two military bases in Northern Italy.

=== Malta ===
A resolution adopted by the House of Representatives on 23 June 1988 stipulates that "no nuclear armaments shall be allowed on Maltese territory". This occurred after the Malta Labour Party in coordination with the General Workers' Union blockaded the Grand Harbour to prohibit entry to the aircraft carrier HMS Ark Royal, accusing it of carrying nuclear weapons.

=== New Zealand ===
In 1984, Prime Minister David Lange barred nuclear-powered or nuclear-armed ships from using New Zealand ports or entering New Zealand waters. This policy followed a long campaign by peace activists which included large protests and the disruption of visits by US warships. Under the New Zealand Nuclear Free Zone, Disarmament, and Arms Control Act 1987, territorial sea and land of New Zealand became nuclear weapons and nuclear-powered ship free zones. It does not ban nuclear power stations. A research reactor was operated by the University of Canterbury until 1981. Official planning for a nuclear power station continued until the 1980s.

The Act prohibits "entry into the internal waters of New Zealand 12 miles (22.2 km) radius by any ship whose propulsion is wholly or partly dependent on nuclear power" and bans the dumping of radioactive waste within the nuclear-free zone, as well as prohibiting any New Zealand citizen or resident "to manufacture, acquire, possess, or have any control over any nuclear explosive device." Combined with the firm policy of the United States to "neither confirm nor deny" whether particular naval vessels carry nuclear weapons (a "policy of deliberate ambiguity"), the Act effectively bars these ships from entering New Zealand waters.

New Zealand's security treaty with the United States, ANZUS, did not mention nuclear deterrence and did not require unconditional port access. However, after New Zealand refused entry to USS Buchanan in 1985, the United States government suspended its ANZUS obligations to New Zealand, seeing New Zealand's effective rejection of United States Navy vessels as voiding the treaty. The Lange Labour government did not see their stance as incompatible with the treaty and sought a compromise for over two years before passing the Act. Support for the non-nuclear policy was bolstered by the perceived over-reaction of the United States and by the sinking of the Rainbow Warrior by French spies while docked in Auckland. According to some commentators, the legislation was a milestone in New Zealand's development as a nation and seen as an important act of sovereignty, self-determination and cultural identity. New Zealand’s three decade anti-nuclear campaign is the only successful movement of its type in the world which resulted in the nation's nuclear-free zone status being enshrined in legislation.

The nuclear-free zone law does not make building land-based nuclear power plants illegal. However, the relatively small electricity system, abundance of other resources to generate electricity, and public opposition has meant a nuclear power plant has never gone beyond the investigation phase – a nuclear power plant was proposed north of Auckland in the early 1970s, but the discovery of large natural gas reserves in Taranaki saw the proposal shelved.

=== Nordic countries ===
Nuclear weapons-free Nordic (Finn. Ydinaseeton Pohjola) was an initiative by the President of Finland Urho Kekkonen for a nuclear weapons-free zone in the Nordic countries. The aim was to prevent the Nordic countries from becoming a nuclear battleground and a route for cruise missiles in the event of a nuclear war between the Soviet Union and NATO.

The idea was proposed first in 1963, in a speech by Kekkonen proposing that the Nordic countries pledge to not procure nuclear weapons or station nuclear weapons in their territory. At the time, among the Nordic countries, Sweden was close to acquire nuclear weapons through a domestic programme, and only Finland had outright rejected them. Finland was required by Article 17 of the 1947 Peace Treaty to not seek atomic weapons, but Norway and Denmark were members of NATO, and the alliance saw nuclear weapons as crucial to their strategy. Despite both Norway and Denmark being somewhat opposed to the stationing of nuclear weapons on their territory, the presence of foreign military in their countries made an absolute peacetime and wartime ban, as proposed by Kekkonen, practically impossible. Sweden finally scrapped its nuclear weapon programme in 1968, due to concerns of a domino effect increase of countries in the world aiming for atomic weapons.

The idea was proposed again in the Détente period of the Cold War in the 1970s, with the background of both the United States and Soviet Union decreasing their nuclear weapon stockpile. A speech made by Kekkonen in Stockholm on 8 May 1978 presented a plan for arms control in the Nordic region, the strengthening of existing non-nuclear status of northern Europe, and a guarantee that nuclear-armed states would not use nuclear weapons against nuclear weapon free zone states.

The idea for a Nuclear weapons-free zone in the north gained popularity in Norway from late 1980, and gained broad cross-party support in government. At a meeting of Nordic foreign ministers in September 1981, the issue was put on the agenda, but received little attention and no future prospects for implementation. this was primarily due to the beliefs of ministers that the zone should be within the framework of NATO and in a wider European context of disarmament, which seemed unlikely at the time.

The Soviet Union was also interested in establishing a Nordic nuclear weapons-free zone, though likely only as a tool to divide NATO. The Soviet Union did not commit to the removal of any nuclear weapons on the Kola Peninsula or in the Northern or Baltic Fleet. This, combined with the Soviet Union's continued occupation of the Baltic states and the Karlskrona incident of 1981, made the establishment of a Nordic nuclear free zone in the Cold War unlikely.

The United States was against the establishment of a nuclear weapons-free Nordic zone, facing the fact that the zone would be against U.S. and NATO security interests.

Nuclear energy is used in both Finland and Sweden.

=== Palau ===
Palau adopted its first constitution in July 1979, stating that the Micronesian country would be "nuclear-free". The United States told the Palauan government that this constitution was likely incompatible with the Compact of Free Association. The Palauan government submitted a revised version of the constitution without the "nuclear-free" clause the following October. The Palauan people rejected the revised document and reinstated the original constitution in July 1980. Seven years later, however, the Palauan people voted to overturn their nuclear-free status out of "economic survival".

=== United Kingdom ===
The Nuclear Free Zone Movement in the United Kingdom was very strong in early 1980s; up to two hundred local authorities including county councils, district councils and city councils such as the Greater London Council (GLC) (before its abolition) declared themselves to be 'nuclear free'. The first 'nuclear-free zone' in the UK was Manchester City Council in 1980 – this still exists to this day. Wales became 'nuclear free' on 23 February 1982 after Clwyd County Council declared itself 'nuclear free' and the Nuclear Free Wales Declaration was made. This policy was legally underpinned by Section 137 of the Local Government Act, which allowed local authorities to spend a small amount on whatever members considered was in the interest of their area or a part of their area.

UK nuclear-free local authorities refused to take part in civil defence exercises relating to nuclear war, which they thought were futile. The non-cooperation of the nuclear-free zone authorities was the main reason for the cancellation of the national 'Hard Rock' civil defence exercise in July 1982. In England and Wales 24 of the 54 county councils refused to participate and seven more co-operated only in a half-hearted way. This has been seen as a victory for the British Peace movement against the policies of Margaret Thatcher. Generally, nuclear-free zones were predominantly Labour Party controlled councils but Liberal Party and even a few Conservative Party councillors were often active in this respect too.

=== United States ===
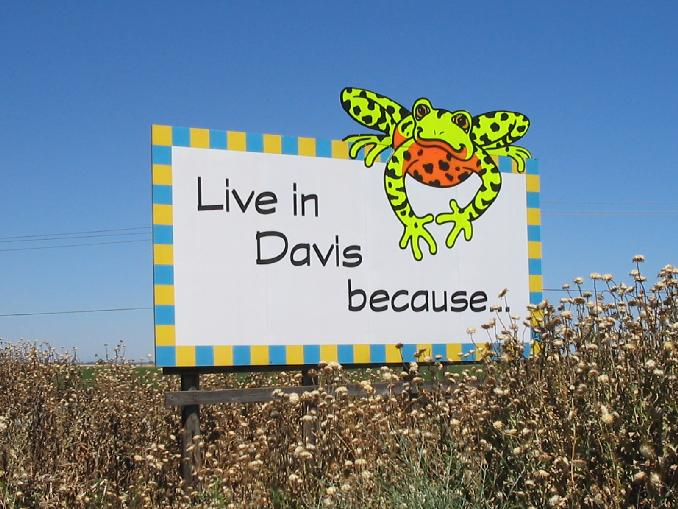

A number of towns, cities and counties in the United States established themselves as Nuclear-Free Zones in the 1970s, 1980s and 1990s. The first was Missoula, Montana. In the November 1978 general election, Missoula voters overwhelmingly approved a ballot initiative in the form of a land-use ordinance establishing the entirety of Missoula County as a "'nuclear free' zoning district" banning all nuclear facilities except those for medical purposes. (In the same election, Montana voters approved a statewide initiative by a 2–1 margin barring nuclear facilities or reactors without strict state-enforced regulatory standards and ratification by popular referendum, and in a follow-up 1980 initiative, Montanans narrowly voted to ban the disposal of nuclear waste.) That Missoula's measure was originally drafted as a zoning ordinance legally enforceable by the county planning department apparently created the popular term "Nuclear Free Zone" adopted as the name of the local political action group sponsoring the initiative and later used by other jurisdictions worldwide.

Subsequently, the tiny town of Garrett Park, Maryland, attracted worldwide attention with its referendum in May, 1982. The next month, Sykesville, Maryland also declared itself a nuclear-free zone, in addition to enacting a nuclear freeze and abstaining from evacuation plans of neighboring counties. In an interview with local historian Jack McBride White, Mayor Lloyd Helt Jr. admitted that Sykesville's nuclear-free zone resolution was made in order to stave off calls for a dissolution of the town government.

The following year, Takoma Park, Maryland, was officially declared a nuclear-free zone in 1983 by then-mayor Sam Abbott. A citizen committee of the local city council continues to monitor city contracts. The city cannot hold contracts with any company associated with any aspect of nuclear weapons without a waiver from the citizen committee. In September 2005, Takoma Park took a stand against the transportation of high-level nuclear waste through the city. It voted to amend its Nuclear-Free Zone Ordinance to give its citizen committee responsibility to collect information and from this information and from consultations with individuals and organizations involved in the transportation of high-level nuclear waste, to advise the city on how to promote the safety and welfare of its citizens from harmful exposure to high-level nuclear waste.

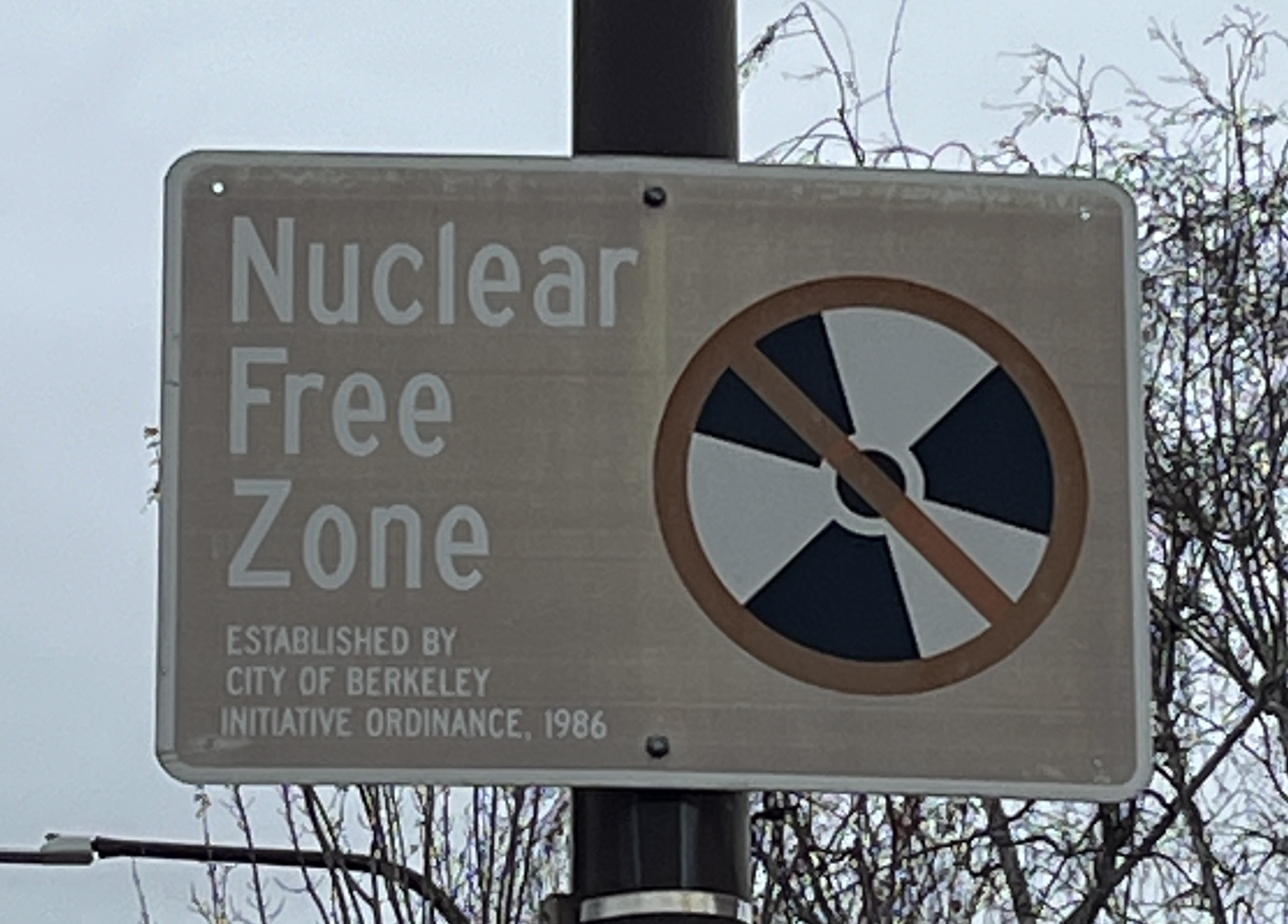
Existing sign (2024) in Berkeley, California declaring itself a Nuclear Free Zone.

Another well-known nuclear-free community is Berkeley, California, whose citizens passed the Nuclear Free Berkeley Act in 1986 which allows the city to levy fines for nuclear weapons-related activity and to boycott companies involved in the United States nuclear infrastructure. The City of Berkeley has posted signs at city limits proclaiming its nuclear free status. The ordinance specifies possible fines for such activities within its borders. The University of California, Berkeley is deeply involved in the history of nuclear weapons, and the University of California system until recently managed operations at Los Alamos National Laboratory, a U.S. nuclear weapons design laboratory, and continues to manage the Lawrence Livermore National Laboratory. At the time of the passage of the act, the university operated a nuclear reactor for research purposes, the Etcheverry Reactor, which it continued to operate after the act went into effect. The University of California, as a state institution, is not subject to Berkeley's municipal regulations, including the ban. Berkeley also has major freeway and train lines which are used in transporting nuclear materials.

On 14 November 1984, the Davis, California City Council declared the city to be a nuclear-free zone. Davis has major freeway and train arteries running through it which are used for transporting nuclear materials. The University of California, with a campus at Davis, runs a research reactor at the nearby former McClellan Air Force Base, as well as workers who are involved with Lawrence Livermore National Laboratory.

==== Oakland, California and Legal Test Case ====
On 8 November 1988, City of Oakland, California voters passed "Measure T" with 57% of the vote, making that city a nuclear free zone. Prior to the vote, the Oakland City Council voted 8-1 to oppose the measure. Similarly, the Oakland Tribune editorial section, recommended a "No" vote towards the measure. Under Ordinance No. 11062 CMS then passed on 6 December 1988, the city is restricted from doing business with "any entity knowingly engaged in nuclear weapons work and any of its agents, subsidiaries or affiliates which are engaged in nuclear weapons work." Two lawsuits were filed against the City regarding the measure, one brought by Pacific Legal Foundation on behalf of businesses. The other was brought by the Federal government in September 1989.

Early in court document filings, the federal government revealed that Oakland was the hub of the Bay Area's nuclear weapons distribution network and that radioactive components of atomic weapons traveled regularly through Oakland. Soon thereafter, the 6.9M 1989 Loma Prieta Earthquake occurred leading to the collapse of the Cypress Street Viaduct in West Oakland. The combination of the information disclosure in court as well as the freeway collapse generated concern from then West Oakland Councilmember, Wilson Riles Jr. who contended there would have been "deaths within a mile radius" had there been a truck carrying nuclear material present on the structure when the earthquake occurred.

The measure was invalidated in federal court, on the grounds that it interfered with the Federal Government's constitutional authority over national defense and atomic energy. The issue being Oakland is a major port, and like Berkeley, and Davis, has major freeway and train arteries running through it. The City did not appeal the decision.

In 1992, the Oakland City Council unanimously reinstated modified elements of the older ordinance, reportedly bringing the total number of Nuclear Free Zones in the United States at that time to 188, with a total population of over 17 million in 27 states.

==== Additional US Cities ====
Other cities, counties, and other governments within the United States passing nuclear free zone ordinances and the date of adoption, when known:

- Arcata, CA (9/15/1989)
- Baltimore, MD (03/02/1992)
- Boulder, CO (1985)
- Carmel-By-The Sea, CA
- Chico, CA (1984)
- Chicago, IL (1986)
- Cleveland Heights, OH (1987)
- East Windsor, CT (12/16/1992)
- Eugene, OR (11/1986); revised measure defeated 5/15/1990
- Evanston, IL (1985)
- Garrett Park, MD (1982)
- Hawaii County, HI (1981); amendment excluding military approved by referendum 11/1986
- Hayward, CA (9/15/87)
- Homer, AK (10/3/89)
- Iowa City, IA (1985)
- Madison, WI (1983)
- Marin County, CA (1986)
- Oakland, CA (1988)
- Oberlin, Ohio (November 1985)
- Napa, CA (1984)
- New York City, NY (11/8/1984)
- Reno, NV (1996)
- Sac and Fox Nation, OK (8/28/1993)
- Santa Cruz, CA (11/17/1998)
- Sebastopol, CA (1985)
- Sykesville, MD (6/16/1982)
- St. Helena, CA (1984)
- Takoma Park, MD (1983)

Additionally, many cities, counties, and states considered becoming nuclear free zones. Locations where governmental or popular votes were conducted and defeated, where known, were:

- Calaveras County, CA (1984)
- Cambridge, MA (1983)
- Fresno, CA (1985)
- Oregon, USA (1983)

== See also ==
- African Nuclear Weapons Free Zone Treaty
- Antarctic Treaty System
- Anti-nuclear movement
- Campaign for Nuclear Disarmament
- Central Asian Nuclear Weapon Free Zone
- Comprehensive Test Ban Treaty
- France and weapons of mass destruction
- Helen Caldicott
- International Day for the Total Elimination of Nuclear Weapons
- Mongolian Nuclear-Weapons-Free Status
- Nagasaki and Hiroshima
- Non-nuclear future
- Nuclear-Free Future Award
- Nuclear testing
- Nuclear weapons and the United States
- Nuclear weapons convention
- Nuclear-Weapon-Free Zone
- Sinking of the Rainbow Warrior
- Treaty of Rarotonga
- Treaty of Tlatelolco
- United States and weapons of mass destruction
