= Nuclear Weapons Free Zones in Canada =

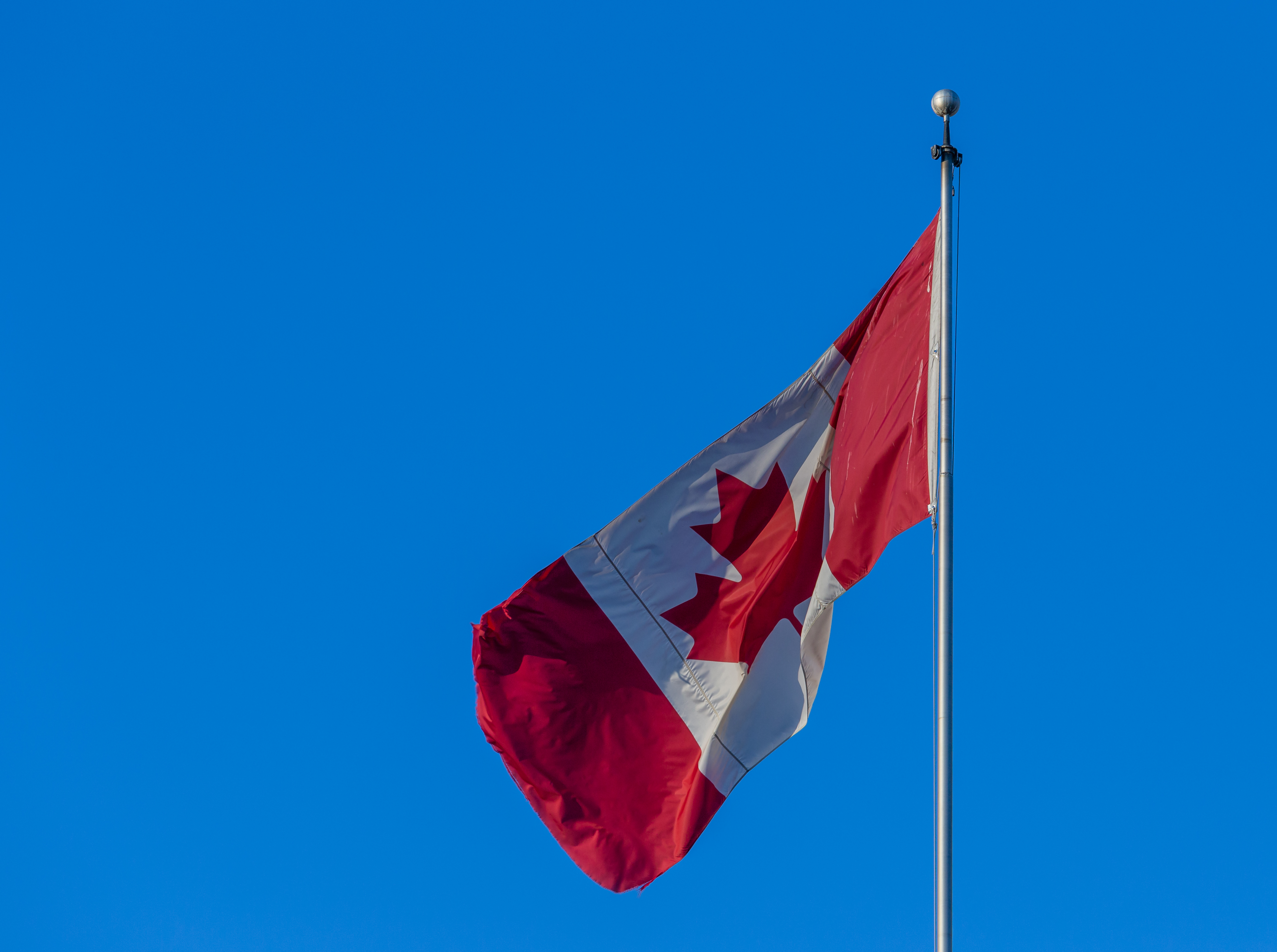
Canadian Flag

In international law, Nuclear Weapons Free Zones are areas in which a group of states has by treaty prohibited the stationing of nuclear weapons on their territories, according to criteria set and recognized by the United Nations. Canada is not a part of any international Nuclear Weapon Free Zone treaty. Canada is a non-nuclear-weapon State Party to the Non-Proliferation Treaty, a treaty that has similar aims to those of NWFZs and even encourages the establishment of multinational NWFZs, but does not prohibit stationing of nuclear weapons and recognizes five nuclear-weapon states. However, certain areas within Canada have voluntarily designated themselves as Nuclear Free Zones (NFZs) or Nuclear Weapons Free Zones (NWFZs). Generally, these nuclear weapons free zones and nuclear free zones are codified within Municipal and Provincial jurisdictions.

Within Canada, Nuclear Weapon Free Zones typically ban the transport, storage, and deployment of nuclear weapons within the zone. Nuclear Free Zones are similar to Nuclear Weapon Free Zones, but also ban civilian nuclear energy infrastructure. The history of Nuclear Weapons Free Zones is closely tied to that of the Canadian peace movement, and much of the support for proposed Nuclear Weapons Free Zones was in response to the stationing of American nuclear weapons on Canadian bases during the Cold War. The Liberal Government of Lester B. Pearson equipped Canadian forces to deliver nuclear weapons, though the warheads themselves were property of the United States and remained in the custody of American personnel. All US nuclear weapons were withdrawn from Canadian bases by 1984.

Proposals to declare all of Canada as a Nuclear Weapon Free Zone have existed since the days of the Cold War and have been debated in the House of Commons, but have never passed into law. Nuclear Weapons Free Zones continue to be relevant in Canadian Politics in the post Cold War. US testing of nuclear-capable systems in the waters of British Columbia has stirred controversy, as the Parliament of British Columbia has voted to declare itself a NWFZ. Additionally, activists have proposed the creation of an Arctic Nuclear Free Zone, a proposal that has received increased attention due to the ongoing discourse around anthropogenic climate change.

== Background ==
Canada was a founding member of the North Atlantic Treaty Organization (NATO), a collective defense organization that obligated each member to defend the other in attacks by the Eastern Bloc. As the nuclear arms race developed following the Soviet Union's acquisition of the Atomic bomb, Canadian political leaders felt that cooperation with the United States in the matter of the defence of North America was necessary, given the geographic position of Canada between the United States and the Soviet Union. Furthermore, it was considered likely that hypothetical nuclear strikes on targets in the US would affect Canadian population centers as well. Thus, the North American Air Defense Command (NORAD), a joint Canada-US air headquarters, was established to coordinate the defense of North American airspace. The idea of allowing the United States to place nuclear weapons on Canadian military bases was a sensitive issue for successive Canadian governments, who were acutely aware of the negative public perception of atomic weapons.

In 1959, Prime Minister John Diefenbaker's government decided to allow the US to deploy nuclear weapons on Canadian soil, though not without debate and hesitation. There had been considerable diplomatic tension between the Diefenbaker government and the United States over a perceived American reluctance to consult Canada about operational decisions and changes to the security environment that might affect Canada. They hoped that the formation of NORAD as a joint command would incentivize the US government to consult Canada on military decision-making. Equally, the question of whether or not Canada should procure nuclear arms for use by its forces was controversial in the late 1950s and early 1960s. Proponents of the plan in Parliament pointed out that several expensive military systems already purchased by the Diefenbaker government were primarily designed to deploy nuclear warheads, and that such weapons were essential to fulfill Canada's NATO commitments. Members of the emerging peace movement as well as Liberal Party politicians opposed the acquisition of nuclear weapons, for reasons ranging from the infeasibility of Canada making more than a token contribution to the alliances nuclear forces, to concerns about a potential escalations in tensions with the Warsaw Pact. However, the increasingly tense security situation following the Cuban Missile Crisis of 1962 began to sway the Liberal Party and to some extent the opinion of the general public in favor of a Canadian acquisition of nuclear weapons.

In 1963, The newly elected Liberal government of Lester B. Pearson announced its intention to equip Canadian forces with atomic weapons, a move that surprised many supporters of the Liberal Party. The nuclear warheads were formerly owned by the United States and in many cases remained in the custody of American personnel on Canadian bases, to be turned over to Canadian forces in wartime. However, public opposition to nuclear weapons grew over the course of the 1960s, and with the election of Pierre Trudeau, the government took measures to begin denuclearizing the Canadian Forces. This coincided with a decline in the importance of tactical nuclear weapons in favor of strategic nuclear weapons, and thus this decision was not entirely a political gesture. Many of the systems procured by Canada were intended to counter nuclear-armed bombers and were unable to counter the Intercontinental Ballistic Missiles that the Soviet Union put into service. Nonetheless, W25 "Genie" air-to-air rockets remained in service until 1984.

To a large extent, the Anti-Nuclear movement took shape in the 1960s. Anti-nuclear protests were held in response to American nuclear-capable air defense missiles in the early 1960s and continued throughout the decade. University activist groups, Women's Rights organizations, and religious groups played a formative role in the movement. The push for Nuclear Weapons Free Zones in the Canadian context largely stems from nuclear-armed American forces on Canadian soil. As Canada did not own any nuclear weapons outright, much of Canadian anti-nuclear activism focused on eliminating their presence in Canada. Advocacy for nuclear-weapon-free zones during the Cold War found the most success on the municipal level, while the federal level met similar proposals with little interest.

== Important Figures in Relations to Nuclear Weapon Free Zones (NWFZs) in Canada ==
=== John Diefenbaker ===
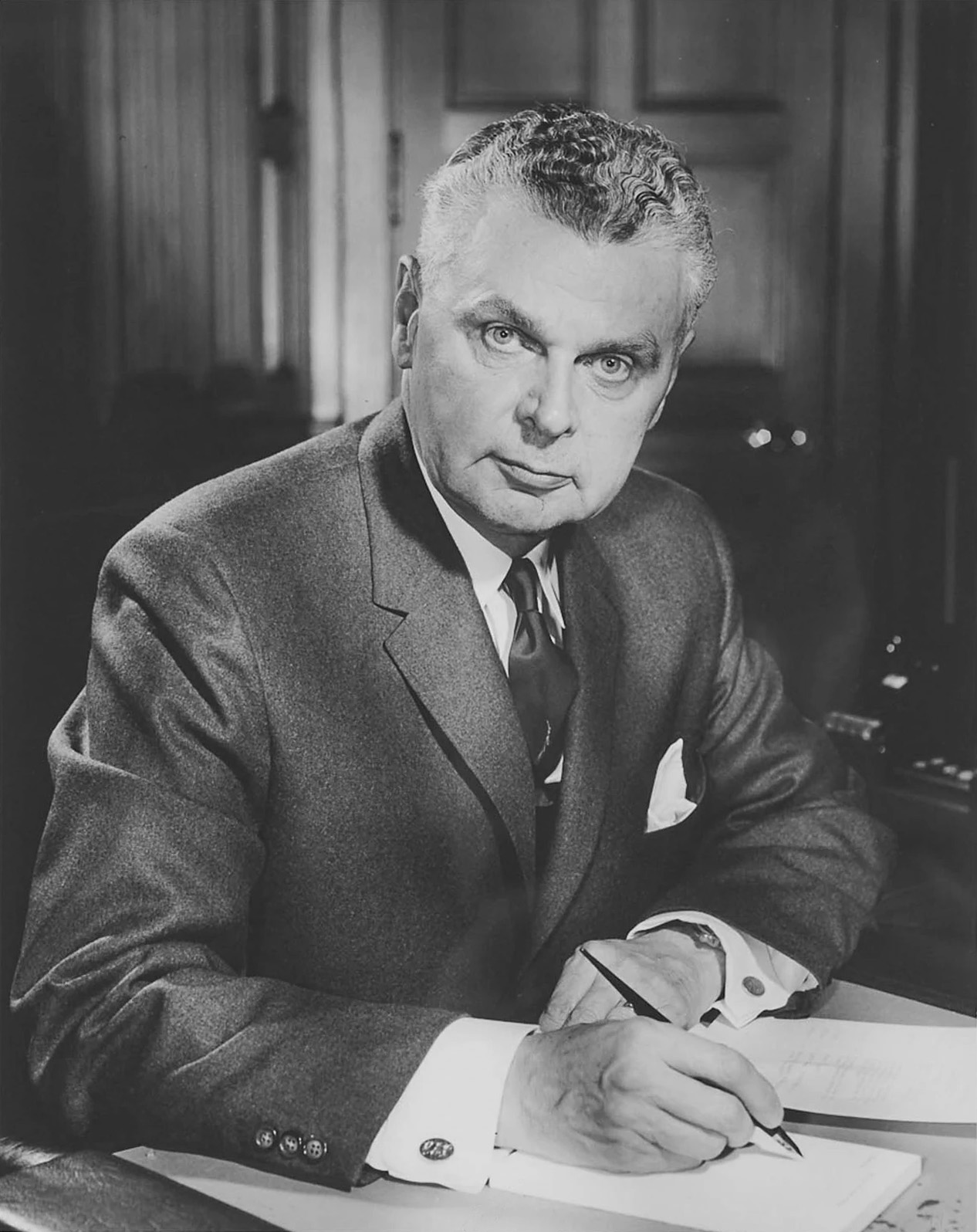
John G. Diefenbaker

John Diefenbaker of the Progressive Conservatives was prime minister from 1957 onwards during a time of great turmoil from the divisive public debate about the nuclear weapons that followed World War II into the Cold War. Diefenbaker's approach to international affairs and relations stemmed from trying to balance political support, public popularity and fiscal prudence. Given the public and significant nature of nuclear weapons with world current events at the time, Diefenbaker would attempt to create defensive policies that aligned with the majority of the public yet while bolstering his party to continue his popularity given his landslide win of an election. Heightened by the Cuban Missile Crisis, Canadians at home were no longer locked in a debate as the side for pro-nuclear weapons was gradually gaining more traction and Diefenbaker's cabinet unity was deteriorating. Diefenbaker began his nuclear policy planning in April 1958 with the Cabinet Defense Committee (CDC) discussing various topics such as: Canada's role and relationship with NATO, proposed ballistic missile defense systems, nuclear stockpiles and more related topics.

For nuclear weapons and stockpiles, Diefenbaker and his cabinet recognized that cost would be minimal in comparison to other defensive proposals as the Americans had come to agreement with the Canadian Government to oversee and be responsible for nuclear weapons in Canada, particularly in CFB Goose Bay, where nuclear warheads were being stored. Though the partnership did occur with the US military in Goose Bay, Diefenbaker was hesitant to approach nuclear negotiations with the Americans as they were concerned about what and how the public opinion may change given how significant and public the topic was. His hesitation stems from these domestic concerns and the political repercussions as he was trying to minimize the public divide of the country. Aside from these concerns, Diefenbaker was not against acquiring nuclear weapons. For a brief period of time, Diefenbaker contemplated whether or not to consult with Lester B. Pearson about the procurement of nuclear weapons as his cabinet advised against such actions to prevent appearing uncertain and insecure of their position. Even though in 1959, Diefenbaker's government had decided to allow the US to deploy and store nuclear weapons in Canada, the agreement and policy surrounding nuclear weapons was not clear due to Diefenbaker's indecision stemming from balancing political support and public opinion. While Diefenbaker was not against nuclear weapons but due to the tensions and his concerns with the public and political audiences, Diefenbaker's government and nuclear policy was poorly designed and finalized, leaving Canadian forces ill-prepared and exacerbating the division amongst the public on nuclear weapons.

=== Lester B. Pearson ===
Before his election, Lester B. Pearson worked as the secretary of state for external affairs and various related positions for numerous years. Pearson made his mark when the Liberal Party's actions in the Suez Crisis were inadequate, creating the United Nations Emergency Force and overseeing missions to resolve the crisis. With his eminent reputation, awards, and accolades, when it was time for Canada's election after John Diefenbaker, Pearson was the ideal candidate for the Liberal Party to reinvigorate itself and win the votes of Canadians. Pearson would come into the position of Liberal Party Leader and win the election to be Prime Minister in January 1958, during a crucial time post World War II during the Cold War.

During his time as prime minister within the Cold War, Lester B. Pearson was the individual who worked hard and collaborated with many associates, such as Escott Reid and Humphrey Hume Wrong, to prepare Canada for the Cold War. Pearson and his associates did so by bringing Canada into NATO and making the executive decision as leader of the country to authorize activities with nuclear power. Through his work and his associates, Reid and Wong, these men played a significant role in proposing the idea of a security alliance amongst the North Atlantic countries for collective security. Pearson would become the first Canadian NATO Foreign Minister to visit Russia. Pearson focused on international relations and the collective strength of countries working together. In addition, he was aware of the perceived threat of the Soviet Union. Hence, the government of Pearson decided to procure nuclear weapons for use by Canadian forces, reversing Canada's nuclear policy. Usages included proposed nuclear testing in Manitoba, storage, and transport in multiple provinces such as British Columbia, Ontario, Manitoba, and Newfoundland and Labrador. Pearson's Foreign Affairs Minister, Paul Martin Sr, dealt with the procurement in 1963. However, despite the placement of such weapons on Canadian bases for use by Canadian forces, they remained formally owned by their partnerships with the United States and the United Kingdom. Such is the case, as seen in Goose Bay, Newfoundland.

=== Pierre Trudeau ===
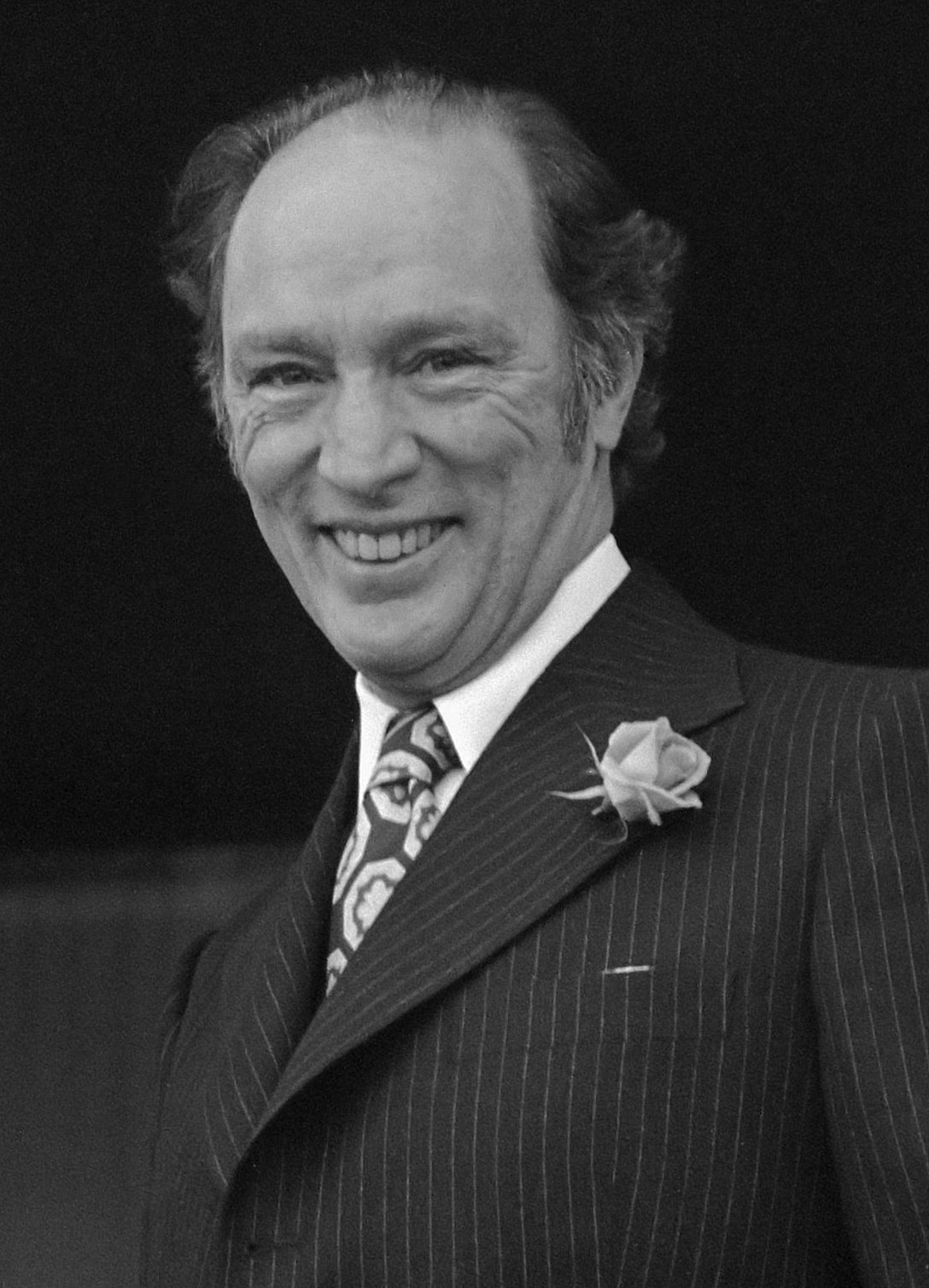
Pierre Trudeau

Pierre Trudeau, who succeeded Pearson, did not share the same political views in international affairs. Upon taking office, Trudeau was skeptical of NATO and tried to distance Canada from the European conflicts. His goal was to re-redirect and align Canada's interest in North America, focusing on the internal security and issues at home versus being in Europe where Trudeau did not see any value in assisting and protecting others that were not Canadian. As a result of Trudeau's skepticism in NATO and international affairs, during the late 1960s and throughout the 1970s, the Trudeau government had reduced Canada's troop and financial commitments to NATO, committing to maintain Canada's heavy armored tanks, iron curtains and hosting the missile tests was seen as a low-cost way to be seen as supporting the alliance. Through the interactions and frequent meetings with the chancellor of West Germany, Helmut Schmidt, Trudeau would realize the political and strategic importance of maintaining international relations and commitment to NATO. The governments could then utilize these relations and obligations to gain instructions, build cultural ties, and foster trade to boost the economy. Trudeau would continue to allow nuclear transport and storage until 1984, when the last American nuclear weapons were cleared and transported out from Canada.

== The Peace Movement of the 1960s and the Emergence of NWFZs ==
The Peace Movement of the 1960s coincided with the emergence of national campaigns to prohibit nuclear weapons on Canadian soil. Sporadic anti-nuclear protests had since occurred around 1960, but NWFZs provided anti-nuclear groups with a tangible policy goal to promote. Although the decision of Prime Minister Pearson's liberal government to accept nuclear weapons into the Canadian Forces was a setback for the peace movement, anti-nuclear activism continued. Notably, the Canadian Campaign for Nuclear Disarmament advocated for a national NWFZ throughout the 1960s. Another important anti-nuclear organization was Project Ploughshares, active from the 1970s onward. This organization was among the first to articulate a specific proposal for a Canada-wide NWFZ, which the New Democratic Party (NDP) endorsed.

== The Later Cold War ==
By the late 1960s, the Vietnam War captured the attention of the broader peace movement. Furthermore, relations with the Soviet Union in the 1970s were characterized mainly by détente, and the anti-nuclear movement seemed to lack some of the urgency it had once had. Nonetheless, there was a resurgence of interest in nuclear-weapons-free zones and nuclear disarmament with the end of the Vietnam War. During the 1980s, relations deteriorated between the Eastern and Western Blocs following the election of Ronald Reagan as President of the United States, and interest in nuclear disarmament intensified. During this heightened period of tensions, Prime Minister Pierre Trudeau's government aroused controversy by permitting the testing of nuclear-capable cruise missiles over Canadian airspace. Equally, visits by American warships to Canadian ports were controversial, as it was US Navy policy to neither confirm nor deny the presence of nuclear weapons on their vessels. All of that led to a revival of interest in NWFZs in Canada, although efforts made at the municipal and provincial level saw the most success.

The NDP, having played a prominent role in the Canadian anti-nuclear movement since near the party's inception, assumed a leadership role in the protests against cruise missile tests. They rejected the Trudeau government's justification that tests were necessary to fulfill NATO obligations. Indeed, the NDP had advocated for leaving the NATO alliance since around 1980. The Liberal Party avoided openly debating the cruise missile issue in the House of Commons. However, anti-nuclear sentiment persisted. Members of the NDP would ultimately sponsor a bill intending to declare a Canada-wide Nuclear Weapon Free Zone, though it never passed into law.

== Opposition to NWFZ proposals ==
There was tremendous pressure on the Canadian government to accept nuclear weapons as a part of its NATO and NORAD commitments at the federal level. That was also a widely held viewpoint in Canadian politics. Although there was considerable opposition to nuclear weapons in the 1960s, many Canadians grew increasingly skeptical of some more radical anti-nuclear groups. Critics continued to state the need to fulfill NATO obligations and maintain a credible nuclear deterrent. However, anti-nuclear activists and organizations point out that such a zone would not necessarily be exclusive of NATO membership.

== Subsequent Developments in Federal Politics ==
The issue of nuclear arms and the testing of nuclear-capable weaponry has remained controversial. In particular, the Nanoose Bay weapons testing area off the coast of Vancouver Island shows the continued political relevance of arms control in Canada. The idea of an Arctic NWFZ has been proposed by activists as far back as the 1960s. With the arctic serving as a corridor for both American and Soviet nuclear strike forces during the Cold War, some Canadian activists have advocated for Canada to exercise its sovereignty and declare a Nuclear Weapons Free Zone over the entire Canadian North. The successful international agreement to demilitarize the Antarctic, as well as proposals for a Nordic Nuclear Weapon Free Zone have both influenced this idea. These proposals are of continuing political relevance today, as anthropogenic climate change and the accompanying thaw of the Arctic Sea ice will open new shipping lanes and commercial activities, and thus potentially make the arctic the site of future conflict.

== NWFZs by Province ==
Map of Canada

When it comes to NWFZ on a provincial level within Canada, there are little to no sources available to prove the provincial status as an NWFZ given that Canada as a country is not and has not ratified the treaties to be an NWFZ. Despite no official documentation or paperwork defining provinces as NWFZ, almost 60% of Canadians live in many provinces and cities that declare themselves as NWFZ, with significant areas having a history with nuclear weapons post World War II, during, and after the Cold War.

=== Provinces ===
British Columbia

On 23 April 1983, approximately 65,000 protesters gathered in Vancouver to protest Prime Minister Trudeau's decision to allow the United States to test cruise missiles in Canadian airspace. These demonstrators encouraged Pierre Trudeau to "refuse the cruise", connecting their protest to the Anti-Nuclear activism occurring in Western Canada at the time. Pierre Trudeau had allowed for the testing of air-launched cruise missiles (ALCM's) as part of NATO's request; however, this was not an obligation of the treaty but a bilateral agreement with the United States. Pierre Trudeau decided to ensure that the U.S. could modernize its defense systems that protect Canada. Roughly a year before this large demonstration took place in Vancouver, a small group of demonstrators took to a town hall meeting in Vancouver to communicate their dissatisfaction with the nuclear policies of the Liberal government to Foreign Minister Mark MacGuigan. One protester even went as far as to spit on the foreign minister's face. The residents of British Columbia have designated the province as a Nuclear Weapons Free Zone and continued to do so even after the "refuse the cruise" movement.

==== Alberta and Saskatchewan ====
The prairie province of Saskatchewan is a nuclear-weapon-free zone; however, it is not free of nuclear waste. The indigenous community of the Meadow Lake Cree Nation suffers the disposition of nuclear waste on their territory. This community began a discussion with the Atomic Energy of Canada (AECL) regarding becoming a permanent depository of American atomic waste in the 1990s.

The 23 April 1983 demonstrations that occurred across the nation also occurred heavily in the prairie provinces of Alberta and Saskatchewan. The residents of these two provinces were protesting the USA testing air-launched cruise missiles (ALCM's) over their provinces' airspace. The Liberal government of Canada almost extended this bilateral agreement to allow further testing over the Canadian Forces Base, Cold Lake in Alberta. On 28 March 1982, before the large national demonstrations against missile testing began across Canada, a smaller demonstration occurred in Cold Lake, Alberta. The 'refuse the cruise' movement began by 300 protesters on that day near the closest civilian access point, Grand Centre, to the air weapons range in Cold Lake. These demonstrations followed for months, with a 290 Kilometers walk across the province from Cold Lake to Edmonton, Alberta, on March 13, 1983. Peace camps were in place throughout the nation, with many in Alberta not just protesting the missile testing over their airspace but nuclear weapons in general.

==== Manitoba ====
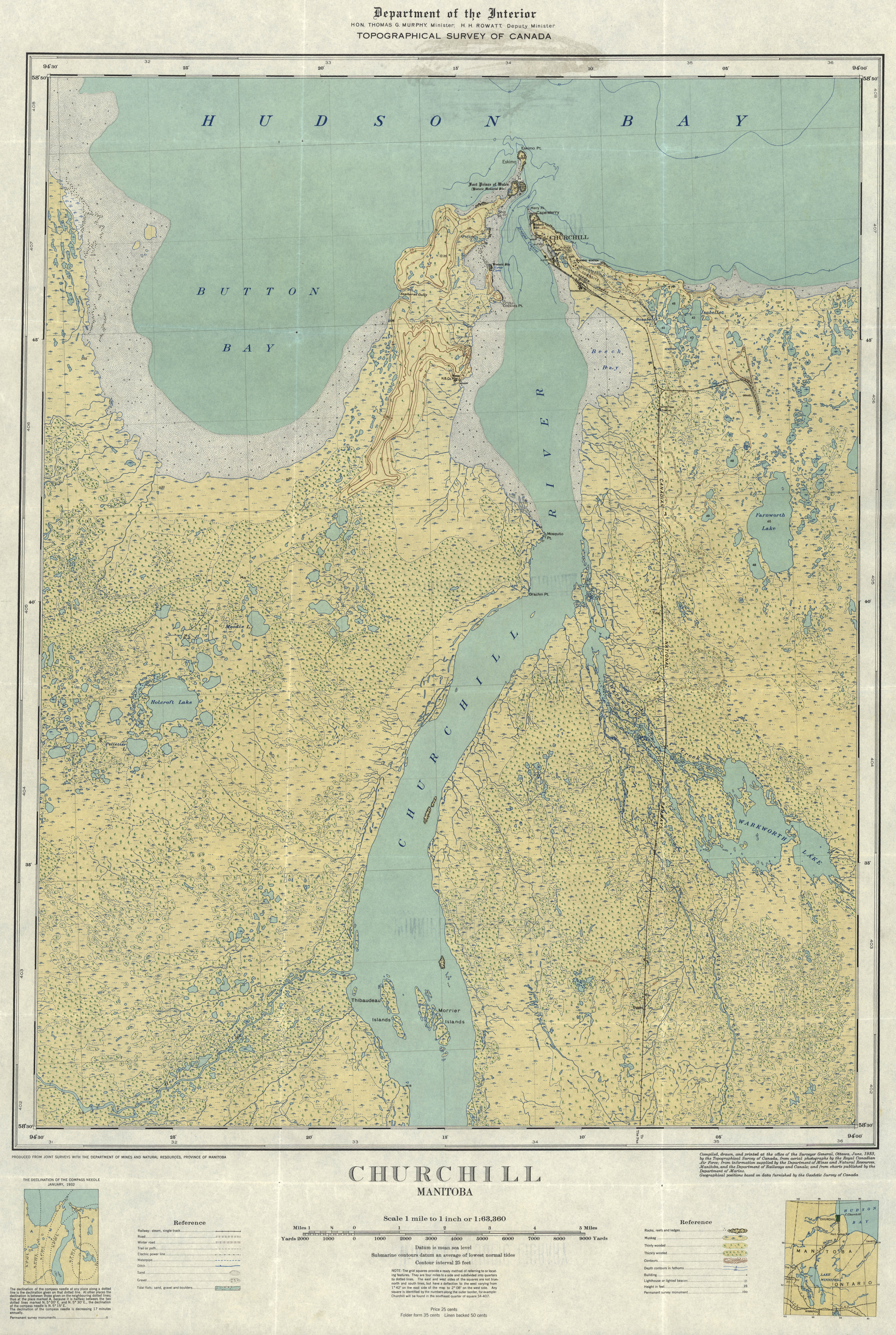
Manitoba

See also: Climate of Manitoba, Biodiversity and Conservation of Manitoba

Manitoba's history with nuclear weapons peaks between 1953 and 1960 during the Cold War when the Canadian government was willing to form a partnership with the British when they proposed to establish Churchill by Hudson Bay in Manitoba to be a testing and detonation site for nuclear weapons. This area in Manitoba was in sight as it had a small population of no more than 6,000 Canadians with U.S. soldiers stationed nearby at Fort Churchill. This testing area in Manitoba was in sight because Canada was a significant military power. The experimentation was supposed to start in 1953 with over 300 staff members onboard to experiment. However, the partnership and investigation never followed through due to geography, climate, and delicate ecosystems. Detonating nuclear weapons would have disrupted the well-known land ecosystem where many watchers and scientists conduct and observe tests in the arctic and sub-arctic biology, geology, botany, and ecology. Furthermore, there were concerns with the radiative particles that could potentially spread southeast towards the urban cities such as Toronto and New York. Alongside the atomic testing proposal, Manitoba had another site that was in utilization for military purposes and training during the 1960s. The proposal turned out, and Australia attracted British attention for the factors that discounted Manitoba, such as ideal climate, lack of population and biodiversity, open space, and distance from Soviet spies. In the 21st century, the province of Manitoba has since banned nuclear weapons.

Territories of Canada

See: Yukon, Northwest Territories, Nunavut

No sufficient information to determine NWFZ status and history with nuclear weapons.

==== Ontario ====
During the Cold War and shortly after the Post Cold War, Ontario served as a military base where the Royal Canadian Air Force (RCAF) established multiple squadrons and training grounds. It was home to the first nuclear reactor built successfully outside the United States at Chalk River, Ontario. The nuclear reactor, Zero Energy Experimental Pile (ZEEP), began construction in 1944 and had work done immediately in the following year in 1945 on the NRX reactor, with the reactor coming active in 1947. The reactor would become the foundation and a model for future energy-producing reactors, pushing Canada to the global forefront of nuclear research during the late 1940s. In the 20th century, Ontario is now a province that has banned nuclear weapons, with Toronto as a self-declared nuclear-weapons-free zone. The city of Toronto has reaffirmed its status as a nuclear-weapons-free zone several times, with the most recent case re-affirming its position as an NWFZ.

Quebec

See: Quebec

No sufficient information to determine NWFZ status and history with nuclear weapons.

==== Newfoundland and Labrador ====
See also: Harmon Air Force Base, CFB Goose Bay, Fat Man Atomic Bomb, Maritimes

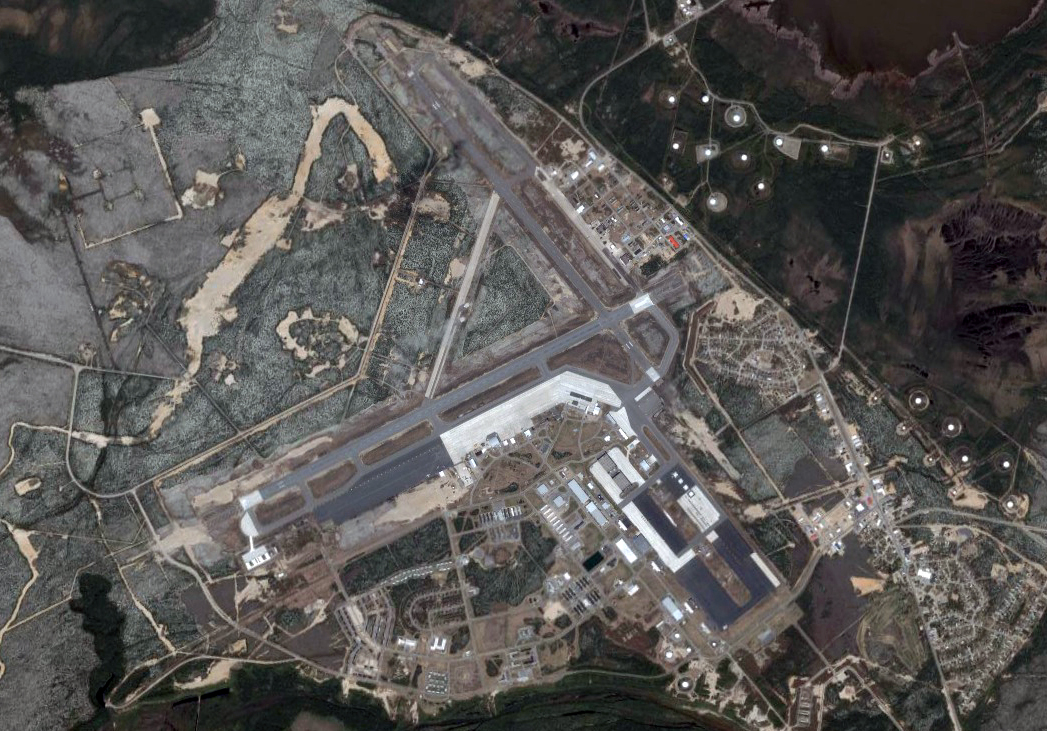
Goose Bay

The province of Newfoundland and Labrador during the Cold War was used as a bargaining tool by the British Crown to the Americans to secure more nuclear weapons in return for leasing the land to the US for a time duration. The province was significant during this time as Harmon Field and Goose Bay were already military bases and served as meeting locations with the Canadians, British, and Americans. The joint partnership was made possible by signing the Ogdensburg Agreement in August 1940, but, instead of a partnership, the American military primarily directed the activities.

The US military was highly interested in Goose Bay. It was an important strategic military site as the site already had the Royal Canadian Air Force (RCAF) stationed, strategic geographic positioning against the USSR, and storage facilities to store nuclear weapons. Given the strategic benefits of Goose Bay, the US military would station military, United States Air Force (USAF) fighter squadrons, and civilian personnel on the land, push for site funding and run military operations out of Goose Bay given the geographic usefulness to travel in Europe. Eventually, Goose Bay would come to temporarily store atomic bombs under the joint-partnership within the military base between the US and Canada. The facility held bombs, such as MB-1 Genie, Strategic Air Command (SAC), and Fat Man style gravity bombs. As for nuclear activity, the military site in Goose Bay, Canada, was to be used solely as a temporary atomic storage facility for nuclear weapons and components in transit. No permanent storage, use, or testing was to be allowed. However, the American military was interested in developing Goose Bay to integrate nuclear capabilities for global air defense.

The Canadian government did not feel comfortable with the decision to store Strategic Air Command (SAC) heavy offensive nuclear weapons. Hence, this uneasiness within the government later contributed to the strict customs policies that American weapons had to undergo before weapons could be transported and temporarily stored within Goose Bay. Further, following multiple negotiations, the US would gradually pull out all their personnel and interceptors from Goose Bay, leaving Goose Bay with no nuclear weapons and fighter interceptors. Presently, there are no documents or evidence that Goose Bay still contains atomic weaponry or that the province has declared itself as an NWFZ.

Nova Scotia

See: Nova Scotia

No sufficient information to determine NWFZ status and history with nuclear weapons. Information has circulated indicating that Halifax harbour is a NWFZ. But no official information can be acquired. However it is noted that Halifax Harbour is allowed to accept NATO military allies with nuclear weapons on board but they must be stowed and secured while in port. Also CFB Halifax has the capabilities of receiving and storing nuclear weapons. Nuclear powered vessels can come to port, but are often docked at Shearwater heliport or off McNabs island where a nuclear response team is posted nearby.

Prince Edward Island

See: Prince Edward Island

No sufficient information to determine NWFZ status and history with nuclear weapons.

New Brunswick

See: New Brunswick

No sufficient information to determine NWFZ status and history with nuclear weapons.
