= Semei =

Semei may be

- Σεμεϊ, the LXX spelling of Shimei
- Semei Kakungulu, Ugandan religious leader
- Treaty of Semei
- Semey, city in Kazakhstan
