= African Nuclear-Weapon-Free Zone Treaty =

- Countries that have ratified the Treaty Countries that have signed but not ratified Countries that have not signed
- Type: Nuclear disarmament
- Signed: 11 April 1996
- Location: Cairo, Egypt
- Effective: 15 July 2009
- Signatories: 53
- Parties: 43
- Depositary: OAU Secretary-General

The African Nuclear-Weapon-Free Zone Treaty, also known as the Treaty of Pelindaba establishes a Nuclear-Weapon-Free Zone in Africa. The treaty was signed in 1996 and came into effect with the 28th ratification on 15 July 2009.

The treaty's informal name of Pelindaba refers to the location where it was adopted by the Organization of African Unity on June 2, 1995, which is the site of South Africa's main nuclear research facility, historically the location where South Africa's nuclear weapons were developed, produced, and stored, until they were eliminated in 1989.

== Treaty outline ==
The Treaty prohibits the research, development, manufacture, stockpiling, acquisition, testing, possession, control or stationing of nuclear explosive devices in the territory of parties to the Treaty and the dumping of radioactive wastes in the African zone by Treaty parties. The Treaty also prohibits any attack against nuclear installations in the zone by Treaty parties and requires them to maintain the highest standards of physical protection of nuclear material, facilities and equipment, which are to be used exclusively for peaceful purposes. The Treaty requires all parties to apply full-scope International Atomic Energy Agency safeguards to all their peaceful nuclear activities. A mechanism to verify compliance, including the establishment of the African Commission on Nuclear Energy, has been established by the Treaty. Its office will be in South Africa. The Treaty affirms the right of each party to decide for itself whether to allow visits by foreign ships and aircraft to its ports and airfields, explicitly upholds the freedom of navigation on the high seas and does not affect rights to passage through territorial waters guaranteed by international law.

== Area of application ==
"African nuclear-weapon-free zone" means the territory of the continent of Africa, island states that are members of OAU, and all islands considered by the Organization of African Unity in its resolutions to be part of Africa; "Territory" means the land territory, internal waters, territorial seas and archipelagic waters and the airspace above them as well as the seabed and subsoil beneath.

The African Nuclear-Weapon-Free Zone (ANWFZ) covers the entire African continent as well as the following islands: Agaléga Islands, Bassas da India, Cabo Verde, Canary Islands, Cargados Carajos, Chagos Archipelago - Diego Garcia, Comoros, Europa Island, Juan de Nova, Madagascar, Mauritius, Mayotte, Prince Edward & Marion Islands, São Tomé and Príncipe, Réunion, Rodrigues Island, Seychelles, Tromelin Island, and Zanzibar and Pemba Islands.

This list does not mention the mid-ocean islands of St. Helena 1,900 km west from southern Angola or its dependencies including Ascension Island and Tristan da Cunha, Bouvet Island 2,500 km southwest from Cape Town, the Crozet Islands 2,350 km south of Madagascar, Kerguelen, or Île Amsterdam and Île Saint-Paul, which, (with American Samoa in the Pacific Ocean), are the only Southern Hemisphere lands not in any of the Nuclear-Weapon-Free Zones.

== History ==
The quest for a nuclear free Africa began when the Organization of African Unity formally stated its desire for a Treaty ensuring the denuclearization of Africa at its first Summit in Cairo in July 1964. The Treaty was opened for signature on 11 April 1996 in Cairo, Egypt. All the States of Africa are eligible to become parties to the Treaty, which will enter into force upon its 28th ratification; the Protocols with also come into force at that time for those Protocol signatories that have deposited their instruments of ratification. It was reported in 1996 that no African Arab state would ratify the Treaty until Israel renounces its nuclear weapons program. However, Algeria, Libya, and Mauritania have since ratified the Treaty.

The United Nations General Assembly has passed without a vote identical resolutions in 1997 (twice), 1999, 2001, 2003, and 2005 calling upon African States that have not yet done so to sign and ratify the Treaty as soon as possible so that it may enter into force without delay, and for States contemplated in Protocol III to take all necessary measures to ensure its speedy application. A resolution had been passed in 1995 in support of the final text of the Treaty.

== Ratified or acceded states ==
As of May 2022, the Treaty has been ratified by 44 states, and entered into force on 15 July 2009.

State	Signed	Deposited	Method
Algeria	Apr 11, 1996	Feb 11, 1998	Ratification
Angola	Apr 11, 1996	Jun 20, 2014	Ratification
Benin	Apr 11, 1996	Sep 4, 2007	Ratification
Botswana	Jun 9, 1998	Jun 16, 1999	Ratification
Burkina Faso	Apr 11, 1996	Aug 27, 1998	Ratification
Burundi	Apr 11, 1996	Jul 15, 2009	Ratification
Cabo Verde	Apr 11, 1996	Feb 7, 2020	Ratification
Cameroon	Apr 11, 1996	Sep 28, 2010	Ratification
Chad	Apr 11, 1996	Jan 18, 2012	Ratification
Comoros	Apr 11, 1996	Jul 24, 2012	Ratification
Congo, Democratic Republic of the	Apr 11, 1996	Feb 23, 2022	Ratification
Congo, Republic of the	Jan 27, 1997	Nov 26, 2013	Ratification
Côte d'Ivoire	Apr 11, 1996	Jul 28, 1999	Ratification
Equatorial Guinea		Feb 19, 2003	Accession
Ethiopia	Apr 11, 1996	Mar 13, 2008	Ratification
Gabon	Apr 11, 1996	Jun 12, 2007	Ratification
Gambia	Apr 11, 1996	Oct 16, 1996	Ratification
Ghana	Apr 11, 1996	Jun 27, 2011	Ratification
Guinea	Apr 11, 1996	Jan 21, 2000	Ratification
Guinea-Bissau	Apr 11, 1996	Jan 4, 2012	Ratification
Kenya	Apr 11, 1996	Jan 9, 2001	Ratification
Lesotho	Apr 11, 1996	Mar 14, 2002	Ratification
Libya	Apr 11, 1996	May 11, 2005	Ratification
Madagascar		Dec 23, 2003	Accession
Malawi	Apr 11, 1996	Apr 23, 2009	Ratification
Mali	Apr 11, 1996	Jul 22, 1999	Ratification
Mauritania	Apr 11, 1996	Feb 24, 1998	Ratification
Mauritius	Apr 11, 1996	Apr 24, 1996	Ratification
Morocco	Apr 11, 1996	Apr 18, 2022	Ratification
Mozambique	Apr 11, 1996	Aug 28, 2008	Ratification
Namibia	Apr 11, 1996	Mar 1, 2012	Ratification
Niger	Apr 11, 1996	Feb 22, 2017	Ratification
Nigeria	Apr 11, 1996	Jun 18, 2001	Ratification
Rwanda	Apr 11, 1996	Feb 1, 2007	Ratification
Sahrawi Arab Democratic Republic	Jun 20, 2006	Jan 27, 2014	Ratification
Senegal	Apr 11, 1996	Oct 25, 2006	Ratification
Seychelles	Jul 9, 1996	May 23, 2014	Ratification
South Africa	Apr 11, 1996	Mar 27, 1998	Ratification
Swaziland	Apr 11, 1996	Jul 17, 2000	Ratification
Tanzania	Apr 11, 1996	Jun 19, 1998	Ratification
Togo	Apr 11, 1996	Jul 18, 2000	Ratification
Tunisia	Apr 11, 1996	Oct 7, 2009	Ratification
Zambia	Apr 11, 1996	Aug 18, 2010	Ratification
Zimbabwe	Apr 11, 1996	Apr 6, 1998	Ratification

== States that have signed but not ratified ==
All countries are members of the African Union

State	Signed
Central African Republic	Apr 11, 1996
Djibouti	Apr 11, 1996
Egypt	Apr 11, 1996
Eritrea	Apr 11, 1996
Liberia	Jul 9, 1996
São Tomé and Príncipe	Jul 9, 1996
Sierra Leone	Apr 11, 1996
Somalia	Feb 23, 2006
Sudan	Apr 11, 1996
Uganda	Apr 11, 1996

== Non-signatory states ==
State
South Sudan - (part of Sudan until July 2011)

== Nuclear-weapon states and the African Nuclear Weapon Free Zone ==
Nuclear-Weapon-Free Zones NW states Nuclear sharing NPT only: Treaty / Region / Land area / States / In force; Antarctic / Antarctica / 14,000,000 km^{2} / / 1961-06-23; Space / Outer Space / / / 1967-10-10; Tlatelolco / Latin America; Caribbean / 21,069,501 km^{2} / 33 / 1969-04-25; Seabed / Seabed / / / 1972-05-18; Rarotonga / South Pacific / 9,008,458 km^{2} / 13 / 1986-12-11; Bangkok / ASEAN / 4,465,501 km^{2} / 10 / 1997-03-28; MNWFS / Mongolia / 1,564,116 km^{2} / 1 / 2000-02-28; CANWFZ / Central Asia / 4,003,451 km^{2} / 5 / 2009-03-21; Pelindaba / Africa / 30,221,532 km^{2} / 53 / 2009-07-15; / Total: / 84,000,000 km^{2} / 116

The Treaty has three Protocols.

Under Protocol I, the United States, France, the United Kingdom, Russia and the People's Republic of China are invited to agree not to use or threaten to use a nuclear explosive device against any Treaty party or against any territory of a Protocol III party within the African zone.

Under Protocol II, the United States, France, the United Kingdom, the Russian Federation and China are invited to agree not to test or assist or encourage the testing of a nuclear explosive device anywhere within the African zone.

Protocol III is open to states with dependent territories in the zone and obligates them to observe certain provisions of the Treaty with respect to these territories; only Spain and France may become Parties to it.

The United Kingdom, France, the Russian Federation and China have signed and ratified the Protocols, but the United States has yet to ratify. Spain has neither signed nor ratified Protocol III.

The United States has supported the concept of the denuclearization of Africa since the first United Nations General Assembly resolution on this issue in 1965 and has played an active role in drafting the final text of the Treaty and Protocols. The United States signed Protocols I and II in 1996, but has not ratified them. In May 2010, U.S. Secretary of State Hillary Clinton announced that the Obama Administration would submit these protocols to the U.S. Senate for advice and consent to ratification.

The status of the Indian Ocean island of Diego Garcia, controlled by the United Kingdom and used as a military base by the United States, with regard to the Treaty is unclear. Diego Garcia is part of the Chagos Archipelago claimed by Mauritius. The other islands of the Chagos Archipelago are considered in Africa and are under the treaty, but neither the United States nor the United Kingdom recognizes Diego Garcia as being subject to the Treaty.

== Enforcement ==
To allow for the verification of its nuclear non-proliferation undertaking, the Treaty requires parties to conclude comprehensive safeguards agreements with the IAEA equivalent to the agreements required in connection with the Treaty on the Non-Proliferation of Nuclear Weapons (NPT). Twenty-one States in Africa have yet to bring such agreements into force. The IAEA encourages them to bring these agreements into force as soon as possible.

According to Article 12 (Mechanism for compliance) of the Treaty, after entry-into-force, the Parties agree to establish an African Commission on Nuclear Energy (AFCONE). In addition to being a compliance mechanism, the commission will be responsible for encouraging regional and sub-regional programmes for co-operation in the peaceful uses of nuclear science and technology. The establishment of AFCONE would also: encourage African states to take responsibility for their natural resources, and in particular nuclear material; and protect against the dumping of toxic waste.
