= Biodiversity and conservation in Manitoba =

Manitoba is home to a variety of ecosystems across the province that need to be considered in development and conservation plans. There are terrestrial ecosystems, which includes prairies, boreal forest, and tundra. Manitoba is also the home to a number of aquatic ecosystems, including wetlands, rivers, and lakes. There is also a wide variety of wildlife and plants that thrive in this particular region. However, human impact has become more apparent and the need to protect and conserve is becoming clear.

The Province of Manitoba created a protection act in March 1990 called The Endangered Species Ecosystem Act. The Act protects animals, plants, and ecosystems by supporting and monitoring development at a provincial level. This includes monitoring the land use, protection areas, planning, environmental assessment, and natural resources harvesting policies by incorporating the biodiversity values in their decision making.

In June 2003, the federal government created the Species at Risk Act (SARA). The Act is to prevent wildlife species in Canada from disappearing, provide recovery of wildlife species that are endangered or threatened as a result of human activity, and prevent future loss of species (Canada.ca, 2020). A key component of the success of SARA is the participation of other levels of government to contribute in enforcing and protecting wildlife. Consulting and having cooperation of aboriginal communities and all stakeholders that may be affected in the protection of wildlife is another component of the Act's success. There are a number of Manitoban species on the SARA list that are now protected at a federal level, which will help reinforce their safety.

More information about what Manitoba is doing to help protect the environment apart from biodiversity can be found on their website. The website highlights a number of subcategories of concerns regarding the environment, including:

- Invasive species
- Air quality management
- Climate change
- Pollution prevention
- Pesticide use
- Management of protected areas
- Protection of at-risk species
- Biodiversity conservation
- Management of invasive species
- Ecological reserve programs
- Storage and handling of hazardous products like petroleum
