= Nuclear-weapon-free zone =

Treaty-defined zone in which nuclear weapons are prohibited

Nuclear-weapon-free zones NW states Nuclear sharing NPT only: Treaty / Region / Land (in sq. km.) / States / Date in force; Antarctic / Antarctica / 14,000,000 / / 1961-06-23; Space / Outer space / / / 1967-10-10; Tlatelolco / Latin America and the Caribbean / 21,069,501 / 33 / 1969-04-25; Seabed / Seabed / / / 1972-05-18; Rarotonga / South Pacific / 9,008,458 / 13 / 1986-12-11; Bangkok / ASEAN / 4,465,501 / 10 / 1997-03-28; Resolution 53/77 D / Mongolia / 1,557,507 / 1 / 1998-12-04; Semei / Central Asia / 4,003,451 / 5 / 2009-03-21; Pelindaba / Africa / 30,221,532 / 53 / 2009-07-15; All NWFZs combined: / / 84,000,000 / 115 / 39% of the world population; Nuclear weapons states / / 41,400,000 / 9 / 47% of the world population; Neither NWS nor NWFZ / / 24,000,000 / 73 / 14% of the world population

A nuclear-weapon-free zone (NWFZ) is defined by the United Nations as an agreement that a group of states has freely established by treaty or convention that bans the development, manufacturing, control, possession, testing, or stationing of nuclear weapons in a given area, that has mechanisms of verification and control to enforce its obligations, and that is recognized as such by the General Assembly of the United Nations. NWFZs have a similar purpose to, but are distinct from, the Treaty on the Non-Proliferation of Nuclear Weapons to which most countries including five nuclear weapons states are a party. Another term, nuclear-free zone, often means an area that has banned both nuclear power and nuclear weapons, and sometimes nuclear waste and nuclear propulsion, and usually does not mean a UN-acknowledged international treaty.

The NWFZ definition does not count countries or smaller regions that have outlawed nuclear weapons simply by their own law, like Austria with the Atomsperrgesetz in 1999. Similarly the 2+4 Treaty, which led to German reunification, banned nuclear weapons in the new states of Germany (Berlin and former East Germany), but was an agreement only among the six signatory countries, without formal NWFZ mechanisms.

== Geographic scope ==
Today there are five zones covering continental or subcontinental groups of countries (including their territorial waters and airspace), and three governing Antarctica, the seabed, and outer space which are not part of any state. The Antarctic, seabed, and space zones preceded all but one of the zones on national territories. Most of the Earth's oceans above the seabed are not covered by NWFZs since freedom of the seas restricts restrictions in international waters. The UN has also recognized one additional country, Mongolia, as having nuclear-weapon-free status.

NWFZs do not cover international waters (where there is freedom of the seas) or transit of nuclear missiles through space (as opposed to deployment of nuclear weapons in space).

As of 15 July 2009 when the African NWFZ came into force, the six land zones cover 56% of the Earth's land area of 149 million square kilometers and 60% of the 195 states on Earth, up from 34% and 30% the previous year; however, only 39% of the world's population lives in NWFZs, while the nine nuclear weapons states have 28% of the world's land area and 46% of the world population.

The Antarctic, Latin American, and South Pacific zones are defined by lines of latitude and longitude, except for the northwestern boundary of the South Pacific zone which follows the limit of Australian territorial waters, and these three zones form a contiguous area, though treaty provisions do not apply to international waters within that area. In contrast, the Southeast Asian zone is defined as the territories of its members including their Exclusive Economic Zones, and the African zone is also defined as the countries and territories considered part of Africa by the OAU (now the African Union) which include islands close to Africa and Madagascar. An AU member, Mauritius, claims the British Indian Ocean Territory where Diego Garcia is currently a US military base.

Area in dark blue is outside exclusive economic zones. Some NWFZs are defined in terms of EEZ areas, some in terms of territorial waters which extend only 12 nautical miles.

== Nuclear power in NWFZ states ==
Nuclear power
Country	Plants
Argentina	3
Brazil	2
Mexico	2
South Africa	2

Four NWFZ countries have nuclear plants to generate electricity. South Africa formerly had a nuclear weapons program which it terminated in 1989.

Argentina and Brazil are known to operate uranium enrichment facilities. Countries that had enrichment programs in the past include Libya and South Africa, although Libya's facility was never operational. Australia has announced its intention to pursue commercial enrichment, and is actively researching laser enrichment.

Argentina and Brazil also have plans to build nuclear submarines.

== Protocols for non-member states ==
Territories of outside states within NWFZs
Treaty	British	French	American	Dutch
Tlatelolco	Anguilla, British Virgin Islands; Caymans, Turks&Caicos; Falklands, S. Georgia	Guyane; Guadeloupe, Martinique; St. Barthélemy, St. Martin	Puerto Rico; U.S. Virgin Islands; USMOI	Aruba, Curaçao; Sint Maarten; Caribbean Netherlands
Rarotonga	Pitcairn Island	Polynésie, Wallis&Futuna; Nouvelle-Calédonie	Samoa, Jarvis Island	
Pelindaba	Indian Ocean Territory	Réunion, Mayotte; Îles Éparses		

Several of the NWFZ treaties have protocols under which states outside the zone that have territories within the zone can bring the provisions of the NWFZ into force for those territories. All these territories are small islands except for French Guiana. The United States has signed but not ratified Protocol I to the Treaty of Rarotonga which would apply to American Samoa and Jarvis Island. The United Kingdom does not accept that African NWFZ is applicable to the Indian Ocean island of Diego Garcia which has a U.S. military base.

== Southern Hemisphere ==
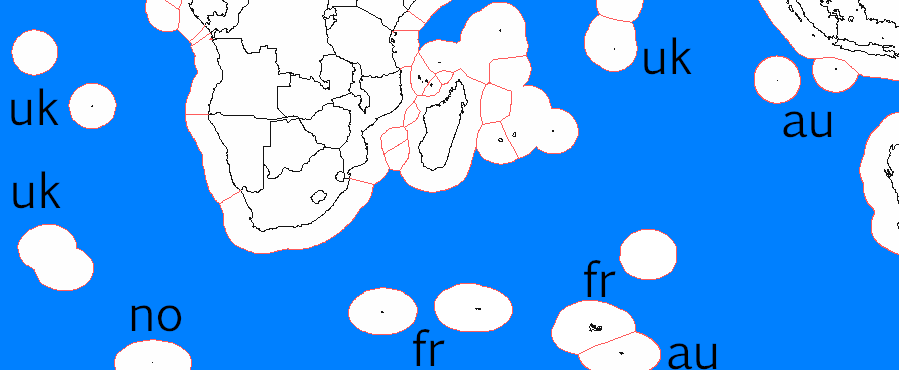
The area between the Equator and 60°S, and between 20°W and 115°E, excluding Africa, Australia and Indonesia and their neighboring islands and waters, is outside the five southern NWFZs. A small area of ocean outside the upper right corner of the map, between Indonesia and Australia, is also not in any NWFZ. Australian islands are part of the South Pacific NWFZ but the other oceanic islands in this area are owned by Britain, France, Norway, and Maldives and are the only Southern Hemisphere lands that are not in a NWFZ.

Few prevailing winds cross the Equator and effects of nuclear explosions in the Northern Hemisphere might send less fallout to the Southern Hemisphere.

The five southern NWFZs together cover all land in the Southern Hemisphere except Atlantic and Indian Ocean islands belonging to non-NWFZ countries in the box (map) bounded by 60° S, 20° W, and 115° E, which combined have less than 8000 km^{2} of land area:

- St. Helena and its dependencies Ascension Island and Tristan da Cunha, a British overseas territory
- Bouvet Island, a Norwegian territory
- Kerguelen, Crozet, Saint Paul and Amsterdam Islands, some of the French Southern Territories
- Chagos Islands (British Indian Ocean Territory) including Diego Garcia (disputed by Mauritius)
- Addu and Fuvahmulah, southernmost atolls of the Maldives

In 1994 states of the South Atlantic Peace and Cooperation Zone issued a "Declaration on the Denuclearization of the South Atlantic" which the U.N. General Assembly endorsed but the U.S., U.K., and France still opposed.

== Tropics ==
Northern Hemisphere tropical lands not in a NWFZ
Region	All of	Parts of
Pacific	Marianas, FSM, Marshalls, Palau	Hawaii (all but NW), Ogasawara Subprefecture (Okinotori), USMOI
Arabia	Yemen	Oman, Saudi Arabia and UAE
South Asia	Andaman and Nicobar Islands, Lakshadweep, Maldives and Sri Lanka	Bangladesh and Mainland India
East Asia	Hainan, Hong Kong and Macau	Guangdong, Guangxi, Taiwan and Yunnan

The Latin American, African, South Pacific and Southeast Asian zones also cover most land in the tropics, but not some Northern Hemisphere areas south of the Tropic of Cancer. Most tropical land outside of NWFZs is in India and the Arabian Peninsula.

Little of the land area covered by the five southern Nuclear-Weapon-Free Zones extends north of the Tropic of Cancer: only northern Mexico, northern Bahamas, northern Myanmar, and North Africa. However, the Central Asian and Mongolian zones are entirely in the North Temperate Zone.

== Northern Hemisphere ==
Nuclear-Weapon-Free Zones States with nuclear weapons Neither, but NATO member Neither, but uses nuclear power Neither, but NATO and nuclear power Just party to Non-Proliferation Treaty

The North Atlantic Treaty Organization is a geostrategic military alliance concerned with most of Europe and North America.

The majority of non-NWS non-NWFZ states are in Europe and the North Pacific and are members of (or surrounded by) collective security alliances with nuclear weapons states dating from the Cold War and predating the NWFZ movement.

Twenty-two states are not part of a NWFZ or a collective security bloc nor nuclear weapons states, twelve in the Middle East, six in South Asia, and four in the former Soviet Union. There have been NWFZ proposals for the Middle East (e.g. Nuclear program of Iran#Nuclear Weapon Free Zone in the Middle East, 2009 UN proposal, 2011 IAEA forum), the Korean Peninsula, Central Europe, South Asia, South-east Asia, and the Arctic.

All countries without nuclear weapons, except South Sudan, are parties to the Non-Proliferation Treaty, as are the five NPT-sanctioned nuclear weapon states.

=== NATO and Europe ===
At the beginning of the Cold War, the United States was concerned that the Soviet Union with its allies and satellites could occupy Western Europe with their conventional forces. Therefore, as early as 1954, the United States deployed its nuclear weapons in the United Kingdom and West Germany to defend NATO countries.

Of the three NATO nuclear powers – the United States, the United Kingdom and France – only the United States is known to share its nuclear weapons. As of 2009, US nuclear warheads were stored for sharing purposes in Belgium, Germany, Italy, the Netherlands, and Turkey. Until 2001, weapons were also stored in Greece. In Canada, weapons were controlled by the North American Aerospace Defense Command (NORAD) rather than NATO until 1984.

Even though the nuclear weapons are not deployed in other NATO states, the United States and the United Kingdom share a nuclear umbrella with all other members of NATO, except France which maintains independent nuclear deterrent. Following the collapse of the Soviet Union, several Central and Eastern European countries joined NATO in 1999 and 2004. The three Baltic states also joined in 2004. In response to the 2022 Russian invasion of Ukraine, Finland and Sweden joined NATO in 2023 and 2024 respectively. The four European Union states not part of NATO – Austria, Cyprus, Ireland and Malta – are part of the EU's Common Security and Defence Policy, which does not include a nuclear element.

In March 2026, French president Emmanuel Macron announced that the country would increase its nuclear arsenal and strengthen its nuclear deterrent in a European context. Among the measures, France announced joint nuclear exercises with other European countries and the temporary deployment of French nuclear bombers to air bases in those European countries.

On 17 June 2026, Finland amended the law to lift the previous ban on the deployment of nuclear weapons in the country, in order to deepen its defense ties with NATO allies. On 6 October 2026, the Parliament of Lithuania passed the first vote to amend the constitution in order to lift the ban on the deployment of nuclear weapons on the Lithuanian territory.

=== Russia and CSTO ===
In 1992, Russia with Armenia, Kazakhstan, Kyrgyzstan, Tajikistan and Uzbekistan formed Collective Security Treaty Organization (CSTO) – a post-Soviet military alliance. Belarus joined in 1993, while Uzbekistan eventually left CSTO in 2012. GUAM states (Georgia, Azerbaijan, Ukraine, Moldova) are not party to any security treaty.

On 27 February 2022, shortly after Russia's invasion of Ukraine, a referendum was held in Belarus on the abolition of the constitutional ban on the presence of nuclear weapons on Belarusian territory. At a meeting on 25 June 2022, the leaders of Russia and Belarus stated that they had agreed on the deployment of Russian short-range nuclear missiles. In June 2023, Russian leader Vladimir Putin stated that Russian tactical nuclear weapons had been deployed in Belarus. This information was later confirmed by Western officials.

=== North Pacific ===
South Korea and Japan are American allies under its nuclear umbrella, while the three Micronesian states (Marshall Islands, Federated States of Micronesia, and Palau) are in a Compact of Free Association with the US.

=== South Asia ===
India and Pakistan are nuclear-armed states and the six other South Asian states (Afghanistan, Sri Lanka, Maldives, Bangladesh, Nepal, Bhutan) are not part of a NWFZ or security bloc.

=== Middle East ===
The six Gulf Cooperation Council states, the 5 other Arab League states outside Africa (Yemen, Jordan, Lebanon, Syria, Iraq), and Iran (see Nuclear program of Iran) are not nuclear weapons states and not part of a NWFZ. The UN General Assembly has urged establishment of a Middle East NWFZ, and NPT Review Conferences in 1995 and 2010 called for a zone free of all weapons of mass destruction in the Middle East. An International Conference For A WMD-Free Middle East was held in Haifa in December 2013 attended by citizens from all over the world concerned about the lack of progress in the official talks.

== See also ==
- International Day for the Total Elimination of Nuclear Weapons
- Lists of nuclear disasters and radioactive incidents
- Nuclear disarmament
- Nuclear Weapons Free Zones in Canada
- Prevention of nuclear catastrophe
- Treaty on the Non-Proliferation of Nuclear Weapons
- Treaty on the Prohibition of Nuclear Weapons
