= Zone of Peace, Freedom and Neutrality =

1971 declaration by ASEAN

The Zone of Peace, Freedom and Neutrality (ZOPFAN) is a declaration signed by the Foreign Ministers of the ASEAN member states (Indonesia, Malaysia, the Philippines, Singapore and Thailand) in 1971 in Kuala Lumpur, Malaysia.

In the declaration, the parties publicly stated their intent to keep South East Asia "free from any form or manner of interference by outside Powers" and "broaden the areas of cooperation".

== Context ==
=== External influence in Southeast Asia ===
By the 1960s, the superpowers, the US and the USSR, as well as growing regional power China had had significant influence in Southeast Asia. From 1961 to 1968, the US had steadily increased its military involvement in Vietnam, providing support for the ostensibly capitalist South Vietnam in the form of military advisors (during Kennedy's term) and later ground troops (during Johnson's term). Additionally, by 1968, the US had had a military presence in Philippines for over two decades, since the 1947 Military Bases Agreement, which allowed the US to use or further improve existing Philippine military bases whenever they saw fit. The US had also established strong military and economic ties with Thailand, through the 1962 Rusk-Thanat Agreement and the 1966 Treaty of Amity and Cooperation respectively.

Similarly, the USSR and China had provided extensive aid to North Vietnam, through military shipments totalling US$600 million by 1967, with the USSR sending air defence weapons and China supporting North Vietnamese ground forces.

=== 1968 Peace Plan ===
The idea of neutralization was first explicitly raised by Malaysia's Tun Dr Ismail Raman in 1968 in his Peace Plan. Neutralization encompassed 'a policy of co-existence in the sense that the countries... should not interfere in the internal affairs of each other and to accept whatever government a country chooses to elect or adopt.'

== Effectiveness ==
There was one serious attempt to deal with regional issues from a ZOPFAN perspective. In the 1980 Kuantan Doctrine, Indonesia and Malaysia called upon Vietnam into a position of neutrality regarding China and the USSR, requiring it to be freed from external influence. This plan was rejected by Thailand, who wished for a solution that would address Vietnam's vast military strength and aggressive foreign policy.
