= Threshold Test Ban Treaty =

1974 treaty between the United States and Soviet Union

Treaty on the Limitation of Underground Nuclear Weapon Tests
- Type: Arms control
- Signed: 3 July 1974
- Location: Moscow, Soviet Union
- Effective: 11 December 1990
- Condition: Ratification by United States of America and Union of Soviet Socialist Republics
- Signatories: Soviet Union; United States
- Ratifiers: Soviet Union; United States
- Languages: English; Russian

Full text
- Threshold Test Ban Treaty at Wikisource

The Treaty on the Limitation of Underground Nuclear Weapon Tests, also known as the Threshold Test Ban Treaty (TTBT), was signed in July 1974 by the United States and Soviet Union. It establishes a nuclear "threshold" by prohibiting nuclear tests of devices having a yield exceeding 150 kilotons after March 31, 1976.

The threshold is militarily important since it removes the possibility of testing new or existing nuclear weapons going beyond the fractional-megaton range. In the 1960s, many tests above 150 kilotons were conducted by both countries. The mutual restraint imposed by the Treaty reduced the explosive force of new nuclear warheads and bombs which could otherwise be tested for weapons systems. Of particular significance was the relationship between explosive power of reliable, tested warheads and first-strike capability. Agreement on the Threshold Test Ban Treaty was reached during the summit meeting in Moscow in July 1974.

Ratification did not occur until 1990 for a number of reasons, including agreeing on ways to verify compliance. To address this issue, both countries agreed to the Joint Verification Experiment in 1988.

== Provisions ==
The treaty included a protocol which detailed technical data to be exchanged and which limited weapon testing to specific designated test sites to assist verification. The data to be exchanged included information on the geographical boundaries and geology of the testing areas. Geological data—including such factors as density of rock formation, water saturation, and depth of the water table—are useful in verifying test yields because the seismic signal produced by a given underground nuclear explosion varies with these factors at the test location. After an actual test has taken place, the geographic coordinates of the test location are to be furnished to the other party, to help in placing the test in the proper geological setting and thus in assessing the yield.

The treaty also stipulates that data will be exchanged on a certain number of tests for calibration purposes. By establishing the correlation between stated yields of explosions at the specified sites and the seismic signals produced, this exchange improved assessments by both parties of the yields of nuclear explosions based primarily on the measurements derived from their seismic instruments. The tests used for calibration purposes may be tests conducted in the past or new tests.

Agreement to exchange the detailed data described above represented a significant degree of direct cooperation by the two major nuclear powers in the effort to control nuclear weapons. For the first time, each party agreed to make available to the other data relating to its nuclear weapons test program.

== Technical issues ==
The technical problems associated with a yield threshold were recognized by the sides in the spring of 1974. In this context the Soviet Union mentioned the idea of some misunderstandings concerning occasional, minor, unintended breaches. Discussions on the subject of such an understanding took place in the autumn of 1974 and in the spring of 1976. The Soviet Union was informed by the United States that the understanding reached would be included as part of the public record associated with submitting the Treaty to the Senate for advice and consent to ratification. The entire understanding is as follows:

Both Parties will make every effort to comply fully with all the provisions of the TTB Treaty. However, there are technical uncertainties associated with predicting the precise yields of nuclear weapons tests. These uncertainties may result in slight, unintended breaches of the 150 kiloton threshold. Therefore, the two sides have discussed this problem and agreed that: (1) one or two slight, unintended breaches per year would not be considered a violation of the Treaty; (2) such breaches would be a cause for concern, however, and, at the request of either Party, would be the subject for consultations.
