= McCloy–Zorin Accords =

1961 accords between the United States and Soviet Union

- Signed: December 20, 1961
- Location: UN General Assembly

Conceived by Dwight D. Eisenhower and John F. Kennedy, the 1961 McCloy–Zorin Accords between the United States and the Soviet Union established a foundation or "roadmap" for all future negotiations and international treaties with regard to nuclear and general and complete disarmament under effective international control. Effectively aiming at abolishing war as an institution, it was unanimously passed by the UN General Assembly on December 20.

The McCloy–Zorin Accords provided far-reaching measures. The Agreed Principles for General and Complete Disarmament, as they were also known, emphatically declared that war should "no longer [be] an instrument for settling international problems;" "general and complete disarmament" was to be "accompanied by the establishment of reliable procedures for the peaceful settlement of disputes." The agreement also called for the "dismantling of military establishments ... cessation of the production of armaments ... elimination of all stockpiles of nuclear, chemical, bacteriological and other weapons of mass destructions [and] ... discontinuance of military expenditures." Member States were expected to make "agreed manpower" available to the United Nations, such as would be "necessary for an international peace force."

In Britain the trend was viewed with favor, its Foreign and Commonwealth Office apparently being happy "to see much in common between the Russian and the American plans," and aiming at "a master plan of our own, which would lead to the physical destruction of weapons, beginning now, and going on until the business is complete..." In 1963 Mr. Harold Wilson, speaking for the Labour Party in an address to the Fabian Society said that he would like to "establish a separate Ministry of Disarmament."
