= Mongolian Nuclear-Weapons-Free Status =

Nuclear-Weapon-Free Zones NW states Nuclear sharing NPT only

Mongolia does not have nuclear weapons.

The initiative to become a Nuclear-Weapon-Free Zone was well received by Mongolia's neighbors, the Russian Federation and the People's Republic of China (both nuclear weapons states), as well as by the world community at large, despite being somewhat unorthodox. Previously, NWFZs had been composed of a group of countries, although the possibility of single-state zones had been long recognized. United Nations General Assembly Resolution 3261 F of December 9, 1974, states that "obligations relating to the establishment of nuclear-weapon-free zones may be assumed not only by groups of states, including entire continents or large geographical regions, but also by small groups of States and even individual countries."

Mongolia's drive for international recognition yielded fruit in Resolution 53/77 D, which was put on the agenda for the next meeting and adopted by the 27th meeting of the General Assembly (without a vote) on December 4, 1998, and stated "The General Assembly ... Welcomes the declaration by Mongolia of its nuclear-weapon-free status".

On February 28, 2000, the Mongolian ambassador to the United Nations Jargalsaikhan Enkhsaikhan presented a letter outlining the Mongolian de-nuclearization law, which was then circulated as A/55/56 S/2000/160. At this stage, it appears that the international recognition of Mongolia's nuclear-weapons-free status is complete.

During two meetings held in February and in July 2006, particular attention was paid to Mongolia's economic and ecological vulnerabilities and security, and the implementation of General Assembly resolution 59/73.
