= Treaty of Rarotonga =

Treaty against nuclear weapons in the South Pacific

South Pacific Nuclear Free Zone Treaty
- Signed and ratified Treaty of Rarotonga
- Type: Nuclear-weapon-free zone
- Signed: 6 August 1985
- Location: Rarotonga, Cook Islands
- Effective: 11 December 1986
- Signatories: 19
- Parties: 17

Nuclear-weapon-free zones Nuclear weapon states Nuclear sharing Non-Proliferation Treaty only

The Treaty of Rarotonga is the common name for the South Pacific Nuclear Free Zone Treaty, which formalises a nuclear-weapon-free zone in the South Pacific. The treaty bans the use, testing, and possession of nuclear weapons within the borders of the zone.

It was signed by the South Pacific nations of Australia, the Cook Islands, Fiji, Kiribati, Nauru, New Zealand, Niue, Papua New Guinea, Samoa, Solomon Islands, Tonga, Tuvalu, and Vanuatu on the island of Rarotonga (where the capital of the Cook Islands is located) on 6 August 1985, came into force on 11 December 1986 with the 8th ratification, and has since been ratified by all of those states.

The Marshall Islands, the Federated States of Micronesia, and Palau were outside the original geographic scope of the treaty but are eligible to become parties, in which case that scope would be expanded. The Marshall Islands signed the treaty on 3 March 2025, but has yet to ratify it as of June 2026.

== Protocols binding other states ==
There are three protocols to the treaty, which have been signed by the five declared nuclear states, with the exception of Protocol 1 for China and Russia who have no territory in the Zone.

1. no manufacture, stationing or testing in their territories within the Zone
2. no use against the Parties to the Treaty, or against territories where Protocol 1 is in force
3. no testing within the Zone

In 1996 France and the United Kingdom signed and ratified the three protocols. The United States signed them the same year but has not ratified them. China signed and ratified protocols 2 and 3 in 1987. Russia has also ratified protocols 2 and 3 with reservations.

== Scope of applicability ==
High seas highlighted in blue.

The treaty's different provisions apply variously to the Zone, to the territories within the Zone, or globally.

"South Pacific Nuclear Free Zone" means the area :

- south of the Equator
- north of the 60th parallel south (the northern limit of the Antarctic Treaty zone)
- east of the 115th meridian east
- west of the 115th meridian west (the western limit of the Treaty of Tlatelolco Latin American Nuclear-Weapon-Free Zone)

plus three projections north of the Equator to include the territory and territorial waters of Papua New Guinea, Nauru, and Kiribati, but minus the northwest corner beyond Australian territorial waters and near Indonesia (and the Southeast Asian Nuclear-Weapon-Free Zone).

Several islands in the Indian Ocean also belong to Australia and are therefore part of the zone.

"Territory" means internal waters, territorial sea and archipelagic waters, the seabed and subsoil beneath, the land territory and the airspace above them. It does not include international waters. Article 2 says "Nothing in this Treaty shall prejudice or in any way affect the rights, or the exercise of the rights, of any State under international law with regard to freedom of the seas."

The treaty is an agreement between nation-states and as such of course cannot apply to those who have not signed the treaty or protocols, for example, the four countries not signatories to the Non-Proliferation Treaty.

== List of parties and territories ==
- Micronesia is outside the Zone except for parts of Kiribati and the Marshall Islands.
- Melanesia is inside the Zone except for Western New Guinea (a part of Indonesia), which is in the Southeast Asian Nuclear-Weapon-Free Zone.
- Polynesia is inside the Zone except for Easter Island, which is in the Latin American Nuclear-Weapon-Free Zone, the Polynesian outliers of Kapingamarangi and Nukuoro in Micronesia, Hawaii, American Samoa and several uninhabited United States Minor Outlying Islands.

State	Signed	Deposited
Australia	6 Sep 1985	11 Dec 1986
Cook Islands	6 Sep 1985	28 Oct 1985
Fiji	6 Sep 1985	4 Oct 1985
Kiribati	6 Sep 1985	28 Oct 1985
Marshall Islands	3 Mar 2025	
Nauru	17 Jul 1986	13 May 1987
New Zealand	6 Sep 1985	13 Nov 1986
Niue	6 Sep 1985	12 May 1986
Papua New Guinea	16 Sep 1985	15 Sep 1989
Samoa	6 Sep 1985	20 Oct 1986
Solomon Islands	29 May 1987	27 Jan 1989
Tonga	2 Jul 1996	18 Dec 2000
Tuvalu	6 Sep 1985	16 Jan 1986
Vanuatu	16 Sep 1995	9 Feb 1996

Territory	State
Ashmore and Cartier Islands	Australia
Christmas Island	Australia
Cocos (Keeling) Islands	Australia
Coral Sea Islands	Australia
Heard Island and McDonald Islands	Australia
Norfolk Island	Australia
French Polynesia	France
New Caledonia	France
Wallis and Futuna	France
Tokelau	New Zealand
Pitcairn Islands	United Kingdom

== Carrying of nuclear weapons within the zone ==
U.S. bomber aircraft have been visiting Australia since the early 1980s, and nuclear-capable B-52s and B-2s operate regularly out of northern Australia. When U.S. bombers visit Australia, the U.S. government does not tell the Australian government whether the aircraft are carrying nuclear weapons. In 2023, the Australian Foreign Minister Penny Wong said the Australian Government "understand[s] and respect[s] the longstanding US policy of neither confirming or denying".
