= Central Asian Nuclear Weapon Free Zone =

2006 treaty by five countries

Central Asian Nuclear-Weapon-Free Zone Treaty
- Participation in the Central Asian Nuclear-Weapon-Free Zone Treaty as of November 2008 Signed and ratified
- Type: nuclear disarmament
- Signed: 8 September 2006
- Effective: 21 March 2009
- Parties: 5

The Central Asian Nuclear-Weapon-Free Zone (CANWFZ) treaty is a legally binding commitment by Kazakhstan, Kyrgyzstan, Tajikistan, Turkmenistan, and Uzbekistan not to manufacture, acquire, test, or possess nuclear weapons. The treaty was signed on 8 September 2006 at Semipalatinsk Test Site, Kazakhstan, and is also known as Treaty of Semipalatinsk, Treaty of Semei, or Treaty of Semey.

The treaty was ratified by Kyrgyzstan, Uzbekistan, Turkmenistan Tajikistan and Kazakhstan, and entered into force 21 March 2009.

== History ==
Nuclear-Weapon-Free Zones NW states Nuclear sharing NPT only

Steps towards the establishment of such a zone began with the Almaty Declaration in 1992. A resolution calling for the establishment of such a zone was adopted by consensus by the United Nations General Assembly in 1997 and reaffirmed in 2000.

Mindful of the lack of support by the nuclear powers for a similar Southeast Asian Nuclear-Weapon-Free Zone Treaty, the five permanent members of the Security Council were involved in the negotiations.

While Russia and China approved of the treaty, United States, France and United Kingdom objected to a clause which stated that the Treaty would not affect the rights and obligations of the signatories under previous international agreements because of the already existent Tashkent Treaty which involved Russia.

The United States also objected on principle to establishment of any zone disturbing "existing security arrangements to the detriment of regional and international security or otherwise abridg[ing] the inherent right of individual or collective self-defense guaranteed in the UN charter".

The United States also objected to possibility that Iran could apply to join the Treaty, so this provision was removed.

The United States, United Kingdom, and France were finally concerned about the possibility that the Treaty could forbid the transit of nuclear weapons through the territory.

In spite of attempts by United States, United Kingdom, and France to block the Treaty, it was finally signed in September 2006, although they voted against the General Assembly Resolution which welcomed the signing of the treaty in December 2006.

All five Permanent Members of the Security Council (also the five NPT nuclear weapons states) signed the Protocol to the treaty on May 6, 2014, which provides legally binding assurances not to use or threaten to use nuclear weapons against CANWFZ Treaty parties.

As of May 2016 all Permanent Members of the Security Council except the United States have ratified the protocols.

== List of parties ==
| State | Signed | Deposited |
|---|---|---|
| Kazakhstan | Sep 8, 2006 | Nov 26, 2008 |
| Kyrgyzstan | Sep 8, 2006 | Mar 22, 2007 |
| Tajikistan | Sep 8, 2006 | Nov 12, 2008 |
| Turkmenistan | Sep 8, 2006 | Apr 19, 2008 |
| Uzbekistan | Sep 8, 2006 | Apr 2, 2007 |

=== Protocol ===
| State | Signed | Deposited |
|---|---|---|
| China | May 6, 2014 | Aug 17, 2015 |
| France | May 6, 2014 | Nov 17, 2014 |
| Russia | May 6, 2014 | Jun 22, 2015 |
| United Kingdom | May 6, 2014 | Jan 30, 2015 |
| United States | May 6, 2014 | |

== See also ==
- Nuclear-Weapon-Free Zone
- Lists of nuclear disasters and radioactive incidents

== Sources ==
- IAEA report
- Monterey Institute of International Studies - Center for Nonproliferation Studies
