= Southeast Asian Nuclear-Weapon-Free Zone Treaty =

1995 international treaty

Treaty of Southeast Asia Nuclear Weapon-Free Zone
- Participation in the Southeast Asian Nuclear-Weapon-Free Zone Treaty includes all of ASEAN
- Type: Nuclear disarmament
- Signed: 15 December 1995
- Location: Bangkok
- Effective: March 28, 1997
- Parties: 11

Resolution adopted by the General Assembly at its seventy-eighth session concerning the Treaty on the South-East Asia Nuclear-Weapon-Free Zone (Bangkok Treaty).

The Southeast Asian Nuclear-Weapon-Free Zone Treaty (SEANWFZ), or the Bangkok Treaty of 1995, is a nuclear weapons moratorium treaty between 11 Southeast Asian member-states under the auspices of the ASEAN: Brunei, Cambodia, Indonesia, Laos, Malaysia, Myanmar, Philippines, Singapore, Thailand, Vietnam and Timor-Leste. It was opened for signature at the treaty conference in Bangkok, Thailand, on 15 December 1995 and it entered into force on March 28, 1997 and obliges its members not to develop, manufacture or otherwise acquire, possess or have control over nuclear weapons.

The Zone is the area comprising the territories of the states and their respective continental shelves and Exclusive Economic Zones (EEZ); "Territory" means the land territory, internal waters, territorial sea, archipelagic waters, the seabed and the sub-soil thereof and the airspace above them.

The treaty includes a protocol under which the five nuclear-weapon states recognized by the Treaty on the Non-Proliferation of Nuclear Weapons (NPT), namely China, the United States, France, Russia and the United Kingdom (who are also the five permanent members of the United Nations Security Council) undertake to respect the Treaty and do not contribute to a violation of it by State parties. None of the nuclear-weapon states have signed this protocol.

== Background ==
Nuclear-Weapon-Free Zones NW states Nuclear sharing NPT only

The groundwork of the establishment of the future Southeast Asian Nuclear-Weapon-Free Zone Treaty (SEANWFZ) was started on November 27, 1971, when the 5 original members of the Association of Southeast Asian Nations (ASEAN), Indonesia, Malaysia, Philippines, Singapore, and Thailand, met in Kuala Lumpur, Malaysia and signed the declaration on ASEAN's Zone of Peace, Freedom and Neutrality (ZOPFAN). One of the targets of ASEAN was also the establishment of SEANWFZ.

However, due to the political atmosphere at that time, including rivalries among the members and conflicts in the region and the Cold War, it was less feasible then to establish SEANWFZ. Thus the formal proposal for establishing a nuclear-free region was delayed until the 1990s, after the Cold War ended and conflicts were settled, and the member states renewed the denuclearization efforts. After conducting negotiations and finalizing the treaty for SEANWFZ by an ASEAN working group, the SEANWFZ treaty finally signed by the heads of government from 10 ASEAN member states in Bangkok on December 15, 1995. The treaty took effect on 28 March 1997 after all but one of the member states have ratified it. It became fully effective on 21 June 2001, after the Philippines ratified it, effectively banning all nuclear weapons in the region. In 2014 at the Meeting of the Commission for the Treaty on the SEANWFZ, the Ministers reviewed the progress on the implementation of the 2013-2017 Plan of Action to Strengthen the SEANWFZ Treaty, while reaffirming their commitment to preserve Southeast Asia as a Nuclear-Weapon Free Zone.

== Listing of parties ==
State	Signed	Deposited
Brunei	Dec 15, 1995	Nov 22, 1996
Burma	Dec 15, 1995	Jul 17, 1996
Cambodia	Dec 15, 1995	Mar 27, 1997
Indonesia	Dec 15, 1995	Apr 2, 1997
Laos	Dec 15, 1995	Jul 16, 1996
Malaysia	Dec 15, 1995	Oct 11, 1996
Philippines	Dec 15, 1995	Jun 21, 2001
Singapore	Dec 15, 1995	Mar 27, 1997
Thailand	Dec 15, 1995	Mar 20, 1997
Vietnam	Dec 15, 1995	Nov 26, 1996
Timor-Leste	Sep 29, 2025	Oct 25, 2025

=== Protocol ===
The SEANWFZ treaty has a protocol that is open to signature by the five recognized nuclear-weapon states: China, France, Russia, the United Kingdom, and the United States. The protocol commits those states not to contribute to any violation of the treaty and not to use or threaten to use nuclear weapons within the zone.

As of April 2015, none of the five has signed the SEANWFZ protocol, but in November 2011 they agreed with ASEAN states on steps that would enable them to do so.

State	Signed	Deposited
China		
France		
Russia		
United Kingdom		
United States		

== See also ==
- Nuclear disarmament
- Nuclear-weapon-free zone
- Treaty on the Non-Proliferation of Nuclear Weapons
- Zone of Peace, Freedom and Neutrality
- ASEAN
- Southeast Asia
