= Treaty of Tlatelolco =

1967 nuclear weapons treaty

Treaty for the Prohibition of Nuclear Weapons in Latin America and the Caribbean
- Zone of Application as delineated in Article 4 of the Treaty of Tlatelolco
- Drafted: 12 February 1967
- Signed: 14 February 1967
- Location: Mexico City
- Effective: 22 April 1968
- Condition: Deposit of ratifications (Art. 29) / waiver according to Article 29
- Parties: 33
- Depositary: Government of Mexico
- Languages: Spanish; Chinese; English; French; Portuguese; Russian

Full text at Wikisource
- Treaty of Tlatelolco; Protocols to the Treaty of Tlatelolco

The Treaty for the Prohibition of Nuclear Weapons in Latin America and the Caribbean (commonly known as the Treaty of Tlatelolco) is an international treaty that establishes the nuclear disarmament of Latin America and the Caribbean. It was proposed by Adolfo López Mateos, the President of Mexico, and promoted by the Mexican diplomats Alfonso García Robles, Ismael Moreno Pino and Jorge Castañeda as a response to the Cuban Missile Crisis (1962). For his efforts in favour of the reduction of nuclear weapons, García Robles was awarded the Nobel Peace Prize in 1982.

The following year, López Mateos invited President of Bolivia Víctor Paz Estenssoro, President of Brazil João Goulart, President of Chile Jorge Alessandri, and President of Ecuador Carlos Julio Arosemena Monroy to make a public statement following the Crisis. They issued a Joint Declaration on 29 April 1963, announcing their intent to undertake a multilateral Latin American nuclear agreement. The presentation of the Joint Declaration at the United Nations General Assembly (UNGA) authorised Mexico to lead the treaty's drafting. The 18th session of the UNGA approved the Preliminary Meeting on the Denuclearization of Latin America (REUPRAL), held from 23 to 27 November 1964. During the first session, REUPRAL established the Preparatory Commission for the Denuclearization of Latin America (COPREDAL).

The preparation of the text was entrusted to the COPREDAL, which established its headquarters in Mexico City and held four plenary sessions. The draft was approved on 12 February 1967. The treaty was opened for signature on 14 February 1967 and entered into force on 25 April 1969. It was the first treaty of its kind covering a populated area of the world, establishing a nuclear-weapon-free zone stretching from the Rio Grande to Tierra del Fuego.

The organisation in charge of monitoring compliance with the treaty is OPANAL (Agency for the Prohibition of Nuclear Weapons in Latin America and the Caribbean).

== Provisions ==
Under the treaty, the states parties agree to prohibit and prevent the "testing, use, manufacture, production or acquisition by any means whatsoever of any nuclear weapons" and the "receipt, storage, installation, deployment and any form of possession of any nuclear weapons".

The treaty requires its parties to conclude comprehensive safeguards agreements with the International Atomic Energy Agency and has a mechanism for states to request special inspections in case of suspected violations. It formally entered into force when all states in zone brought those agreements into force. It also has a provision allowing states to waive that entry into force requirement and bring the treaty into force on a national basis.

Overseas states' territories in Latin American and Caribbean NWFZ
Netherlands	U.K.	France	U.S.
Bonaire; Curaçao; Sint Maarten; Aruba; Sint Eustatius; Saba	Anguilla; Virgin Islands; Caymans Montserrat; Turks & Caicos; Falklands; South Georgia	French Guiana; Guadeloupe; Martinique; St.Barthélemy; St.Martin; Clipperton Island	Puerto Rico; Virgin Islands; USMOI

=== Protocols ===
There are two additional protocols to the treaty:

- Protocol I binds those overseas countries with territories in the region (the United States, the United Kingdom, France, and the Netherlands) to the terms of the treaty.
- Protocol II requires the world's declared nuclear weapons states to refrain from undermining the nuclear-free status of the region in any way; it has been signed and ratified by the US, the UK, France, China, and Russia.

== History ==
In 1962, the Brazilian delegate to the United Nations General Assembly stated an interest in creating a denuclearized zone in Latin America. This engendered interest to create a draft treaty on nuclear disarmament.

Meeting in the Tlatelolco district of Mexico City on 14 February 1967, the nations of Latin America and the Caribbean drafted this treaty to keep their region of the world free of nuclear weapons.

Whereas Antarctica had earlier been declared a Nuclear-Weapon-Free Zone under the 1961 Antarctic Treaty, this was the first time such a ban was put in place over a large, populated area.

Nuclear-Weapon-Free Zones NW states Nuclear sharing NPT only

COPREDAL was the Preparatory Commission for the Denuclearization of Latin America created after the Cuban Missile Crisis. It consisted of four sets of sessions, all of them which held in Mexico City. The purpose of the sessions was to prepare a possible draft of the Treaty of Tlatelolco.

The United Nations Assembly authorised COPREDAL on 27 November 1963. The Preliminary Meeting on the Denuclearization of Latin America (REUPRAL) created the "Preparatory Commission for the Denuclearization of Latin America", COPREDAL.

There were four sets of COPREDAL's sessions. The first set of sessions took place from 15 to 22 March 1965, the second set of sessions from 23 August to 2 September 1965 and the third set of sessions from 19 April to 4 May 1965. The fourth set of sessions, also known as the Final Act, was divided into two parts. Part I started on 30 August 19 and Part II followed on 31 January to 14 February 1967.

In the first two sets of sessions, participants simply reported the activities that needed to be done in the following sets of sessions. The agreements made in the third set of sessions consisted of presenting a report of the previous changes to de Co-ordinating Committee and preparing the draft for the following Treaty of the Prohibition of Nuclear Weapons in Latin America. At the end of the fourth session, the objective was to entry the treaty into force.

Preparatory Commission created two working groups. Working group 1 was in charge of investigating control systems and predominant technical problems. Working group 2 dealt with legal and political questions. A Drafting Group was also created to prepare the final texts.

== List of parties ==
There were 13 initial signatories. To date, 33 parties have ratified the Treaty.

The following table lists the parties to the Treaty of Tlatelolco. All are also parties to the Non-Proliferation Treaty. The table also indicates which ones had become parties to the Treaty on the Prohibition of Nuclear Weapons (TPNW) as of 17 July 2025.

List of Parties; Date of Signature, Ratification, and Entry into Force; & TPNW Status
Country	Signature	Ratification	Entry into Force	TPNW Status
Antigua and Barbuda	11 October 1983	11 October 1983	11 October 1983	Party
Argentina	27 September 1967	18 January 1994	18 January 1994	Non-Party
Bahamas	29 November 1976	26 April 1977	26 April 1977	Signatory
Barbados	18 October 1968	25 April 1969	25 April 1969	Signatory
Belize	14 February 1992	9 November 1994	9 November 1994	Party
Bolivia	14 February 1967	18 February 1969	18 February 1969	Party
Brazil	9 May 1967	29 January 1968	30 May 1994	Signatory
Chile	14 February 1967	9 October 1974	18 January 1994	Party
Colombia	14 February 1967	4 August 1972	6 September 1972	Signatory
Costa Rica	14 February 1967	25 August 1969	25 August 1969	Party
Cuba	25 March 1995	23 October 2002	23 October 2002	Party
Dominica	2 May 1989	4 June 1993	25 August 1993	Party
Dominican Republic	28 July 1967	14 June 1968	14 June 1968	Party
Ecuador	14 February 1967	11 February 1969	11 February 1969	Party
El Salvador	14 February 1967	22 April 1968	22 April 1968	Party
Grenada	29 April 1975	20 June 1975	20 June 1975	Party
Guatemala	14 February 1967	6 February 1970	6 February 1970	Party
Guyana	16 January 1995	16 January 1995	14 May 1997	Party
Haiti	14 February 1967	23 May 1969	23 May 1969	Signatory
Honduras	14 February 1967	23 September 1968	23 September 1968	Party
Jamaica	26 October 1967	26 June 1969	26 June 1969	Party
Mexico	14 February 1967	20 September 1967	20 September 1967	Party
Nicaragua	15 February 1967	24 October 1968	24 October 1968	Party
Panama	14 February 1967	11 June 1971	11 June 1971	Party
Paraguay	26 April 1967	19 March 1969	19 March 1969	Party
Peru	14 February 1967	4 March 1969	4 March 1969	Party
Saint Kitts and Nevis	18 February 1994	18 April 1995	14 February 1997	Party
Saint Lucia	25 August 1992	2 June 1995	2 June 1995	Party
Saint Vincent and the Grenadines	14 February 1992	14 February 1992	11 May 1992	Party
Suriname	13 February 1976	10 June 1977	10 June 1977	Non-Party
Trinidad and Tobago	27 June 1967	3 December 1970	27 June 1975	Party
Uruguay	14 February 1967	20 August 1968	20 August 1968	Party
Venezuela	14 February 1967	23 March 1970	23 March 1970	Party

Additional states also signed and ratified the two additional protocols. Russia signed and ratified as the Soviet Union.

List of Parties (Protocols I & II)
Country	Additional Protocol I		Additional Protocol II	
Country	Signature	Ratification	Signature	Ratification
France	2 March 1979	24 August 1992	18 July 1973	22 March 1974
Netherlands	1 April 1968	26 July 1971	—	—
United Kingdom	20 December 1967	11 December 1969	20 December 1967	11 December 1969
United States	26 May 1977	23 November 1981	1 April 1968	12 May 1971
China	—	—	21 August 1973	12 June 1974
Russia	—	—	18 May 1978	8 January 1979

== Observers ==
Some other countries participated as observers, in every set of sessions such as Austria, Canada, Denmark, Federal Republic of Germany, France, India, Japan, Sweden, United Kingdom and United States of America. International organisations were present as well, for example the International Atomic Energy Agency (IAEA).

The Latin American countries other than Cuba all signed the treaty in 1967, along with Jamaica and Trinidad and Tobago, and all of these ratified the treaty by 1972. The treaty came into force on 22 April 1968, after El Salvador had joined Mexico in ratifying it and waived the conditions for its entry into force in accordance with its Article 28.

Argentina ratified in 1994, more than 26 years after signature, and was thus unprotected by the zone during the Falklands War.

Other English-speaking Caribbean nations signed either soon after independence from the UK (1968, 1975, 1983) or years later (1989, 1992, 1994, 1995), all ratifying within four years after signing. However, as British territories they had been covered since 1969 when the UK ratified Protocol I.

The Netherlands ratified Protocol I in 1971; Suriname signed the Treaty in 1976 soon after independence from the Netherlands but did not ratify until 1997, 21 years after signing. The US signed Protocol I applying to Puerto Rico and the Virgin Islands in 1977 and ratified in 1981. France signed Protocol I applying to its Caribbean islands and French Guiana in 1979 but only ratified in 1992. All five NPT-recognized nuclear weapon states ratified Protocol II by 1979.

Cuba was the last country to sign and to ratify, in 1995 and on 23 October 2002, completing signature and ratification by all 33 nations of Latin America and the Caribbean. Cuba ratified with a reservation that achieving a solution to the United States hostility to Cuba and the use of the Guantánamo Bay military base for US nuclear weapons was a precondition to Cuba's continued adherence.

The Mexican diplomat Alfonso García Robles received the Nobel Peace Prize in 1982 for his efforts in promoting the treaty.

== Diplomatic consequences ==
The basic agreement for Latin America is the possession of nuclear weapons directly or indirectly is prohibited. With the intention of The Kingdom of the Netherlands desire to participate, COPREDAL's members decided not to include countries outside the region, including those which had territories in the region.

The regional territories belonging to countries outside the region would decide either to permit or deny the passage of nuclear weapons; countries such as United States and France recognised those transit agreements. The Soviet Union refused to recognise such transit agreements.

== See also ==
- Treaty on the Prohibition of Nuclear Weapons
- British nuclear weapons and the Falklands War
