= Treaty on the Non-Proliferation of Nuclear Weapons =

International treaty

Nuclear Non-Proliferation Treaty
Treaty on the Non-Proliferation of Nuclear Weapons
Participation in the Nuclear Non-Proliferation Treaty
Recognized nuclear-weapon state ratifiers
Recognized nuclear-weapon state acceders
Other ratifiers
Other acceders or succeeders
Former parties (North Korea)
Non-parties
(India, Israel, Pakistan, South Sudan)
Partially recognized state that ratified (Taiwan)
- Signed: 1 July 1968
- Location: Moscow, Soviet Union; London, United Kingdom; Washington D.C., United States
- Effective: 5 March 1970
- Condition: Ratification by the Soviet Union, the United Kingdom, the United States, and 40 other signatory states.
- Parties: 191 (according to the United Nations, complete list) 190 (de facto) membership in dispute: North Korea non-parties: India, Israel, Pakistan and South Sudan
- Depositary: Governments of the United States, the United Kingdom, and the Russian Federation (successor to the Soviet Union)
- Languages: English, Russian, French, Spanish and Chinese

Full text
- Nuclear Non-Proliferation Treaty at Wikisource

The Treaty on the Non-Proliferation of Nuclear Weapons, commonly known as the Non-Proliferation Treaty or NPT, is an international treaty, the objective of which is to prevent the spread of nuclear weapons and weapons technology, to promote cooperation in the peaceful uses of nuclear energy, and to further the goal of achieving nuclear disarmament and general and complete disarmament. Between 1965 and 1968, the treaty was negotiated by the Eighteen Nation Committee on Disarmament, a United Nations-sponsored organization based in Geneva, Switzerland.

Opened for signature in 1968, the treaty entered into force in 1970. As required by the text, after twenty-five years, NPT parties met in May 1995 and agreed to extend the treaty indefinitely. The treaty defines nuclear-weapon states as those that have built and tested a nuclear explosive device before 1967; these are the United States (1945), Russia (1949), the United Kingdom (1952), France (1960), and China (1964).

As of August 2016, 191 states have become parties to the treaty. North Korea which acceded in 1985 but never came into compliance, announced its withdrawal from the NPT in 2003—the only state to do so—and carried out its first nuclear test in 2006. Four UN member states have never accepted the NPT, three of which possess or are thought to possess nuclear weapons: India, Israel, and Pakistan. In addition, South Sudan, which became independent in 2011, has not joined.

At the time the NPT was proposed, there were predictions of 25 to 30 nuclear weapon states within 20 years. Further non-proliferation initiatives include the export controls of the Nuclear Suppliers Group and the enhanced verification measures of the International Atomic Energy Agency (IAEA) Additional Protocol.

Critics argue that the NPT cannot stop the proliferation of nuclear weapons or the motivation to acquire them. They express disappointment with the limited progress on nuclear disarmament, required under Article VI, where the five recognized nuclear-weapon states still have 13,400 warheads in their combined stockpile. UN officials have said that they can do little to stop states using nuclear reactors to produce nuclear weapons. The treaty was followed by the 1996 Comprehensive Nuclear-Test-Ban Treaty and the 2017 Treaty on the Prohibition of Nuclear Weapons.

== Definitions ==
The treaty defines nuclear-weapon states as those that have built and tested a nuclear explosive device before 1 January 1967; these are the United States (1945), Russia (1949), the United Kingdom (1952), France (1960), and China (1964). Four other states are known or believed to possess nuclear weapons: India, Pakistan, and North Korea have openly tested and declared that they possess nuclear weapons, while Israel is deliberately ambiguous regarding its nuclear weapons status.

The NPT is often seen to be based on a central bargain:

the NPT non-nuclear-weapon states agree never to acquire nuclear weapons and the NPT nuclear-weapon states in exchange agree to share the benefits of peaceful nuclear technology and to pursue nuclear disarmament aimed at the ultimate elimination of their nuclear arsenals.

The treaty is reviewed every five years in meetings called Review Conferences. Even though the treaty was originally conceived with a limited duration of 25 years, the signing parties decided, by consensus, to unconditionally extend the treaty indefinitely during the Review Conference in New York City on 11 May 1995, in the culmination of U.S. government efforts led by Ambassador Thomas Graham Jr.

At the time the NPT was proposed, there were predictions of 25–30 nuclear weapon states within 20 years. Instead, more than forty years later, five states are not parties to the NPT, and they include the only four additional states believed to possess nuclear weapons. Several additional measures have been adopted to strengthen the NPT and the broader nuclear nonproliferation regime and make it difficult for states to acquire the capability to produce nuclear weapons, including the export controls of the Nuclear Suppliers Group and the enhanced verification measures of the International Atomic Energy Agency (IAEA) Additional Protocol.

Critics argue that the NPT cannot stop the proliferation of nuclear weapons or the motivation to acquire them. They express disappointment with the limited progress on nuclear disarmament, where the five authorized nuclear weapons states still have 13,400 warheads in their combined stockpile. Several high-ranking officials within the United Nations have said that they can do little to stop states using nuclear reactors to produce nuclear weapons.

== Treaty structure ==
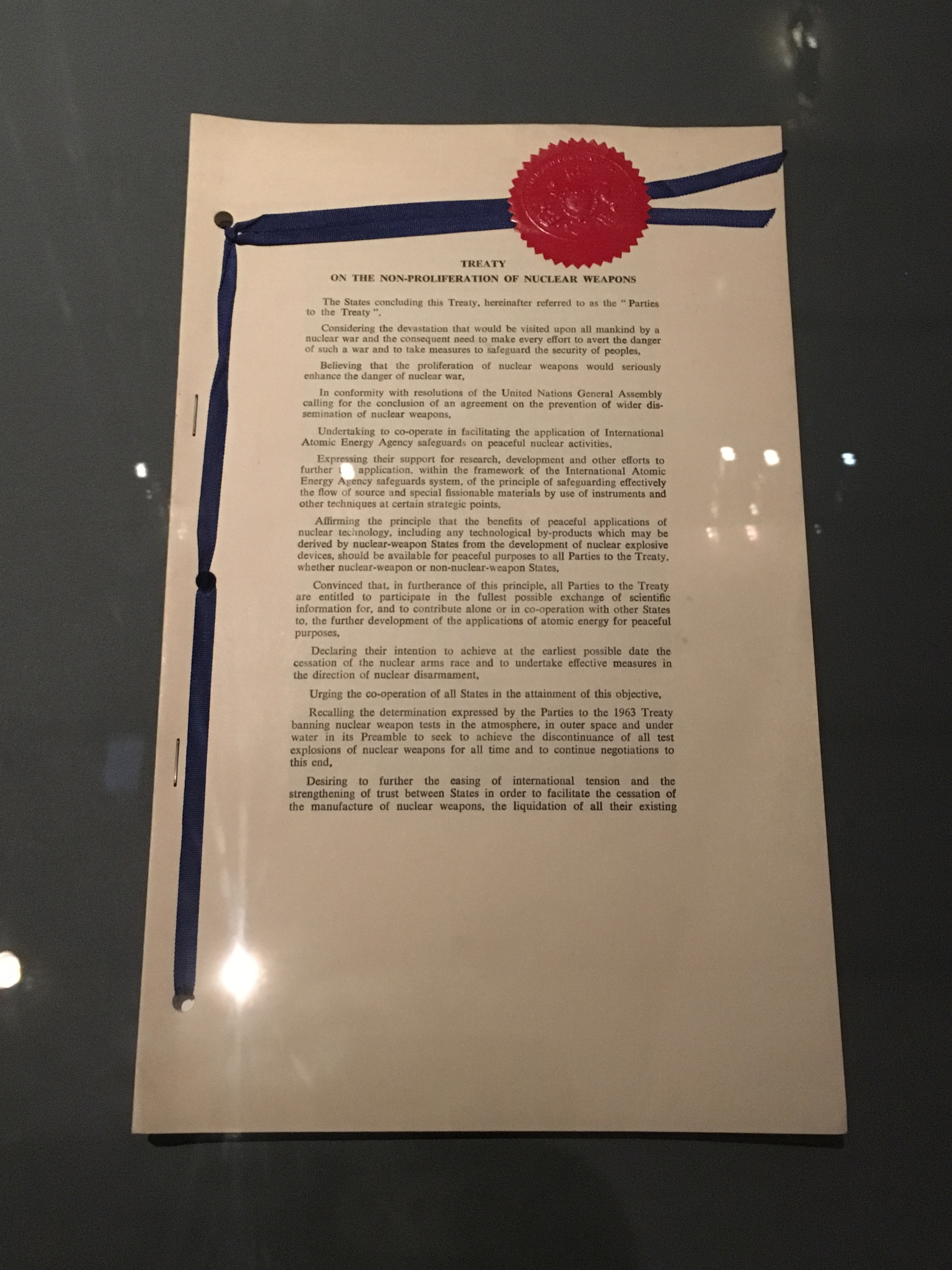
Treaty on the Non-Proliferation of Nuclear Weapons

The NPT consists of a preamble and eleven articles. Although the concept of "pillars" is not mentioned in the NPT, the treaty is often described as a three-pillar system, with an implicit balance among them:

1. non-proliferation,
2. disarmament, and
3. the right to peacefully use nuclear technology.

These pillars are interrelated and mutually reinforcing. An effective nonproliferation regime, the members of which comply with their obligations, provides an essential foundation for progress on disarmament and makes possible greater cooperation on the peaceful use of nuclear energy. With the right to access the benefits of peaceful nuclear technology comes the responsibility of nonproliferation. Progress on disarmament reinforces efforts to strengthen the nonproliferation regime and to enforce compliance with obligations, thereby also facilitating peaceful nuclear cooperation. The "pillars" concept has been questioned by some who believe that the NPT is, as its name suggests, principally about nonproliferation, and who worry that "three pillars" language misleadingly implies that the three elements have equivalent importance.

=== First pillar: Non-proliferation ===
Under Article I of the NPT, nuclear-weapon states pledge not to transfer nuclear weapons or other nuclear explosive devices to any recipient or in any way assist, encourage or induce any non-nuclear-weapon state in the manufacture or acquisition of a nuclear weapon.

Under Article II of the NPT, non-nuclear-weapon states pledge not to acquire or exercise control over nuclear weapons or other nuclear explosive devices and not to seek or receive assistance in the manufacture of such devices.

Under Article III of the Treaty, non-nuclear-weapon states pledge to accept IAEA safeguards to verify that their nuclear activities serve only peaceful purposes.

Five states are recognized by the NPT as nuclear weapon states (NWS): China (signed 1992), France (1992), the Soviet Union (1968; obligations and rights now assumed by the Russian Federation), the United Kingdom (1968), and the United States (1968), which also happen to be the five permanent members of the United Nations Security Council.

These five NWS agree not to transfer "nuclear weapons or other nuclear explosive devices" and "not in any way to assist, encourage, or induce" a non-nuclear weapon state (NNWS) to acquire nuclear weapons (Article I). NNWS parties to the NPT agree not to "receive", "manufacture", or "acquire" nuclear weapons or to "seek or receive any assistance in the manufacture of nuclear weapons" (Article II). NNWS parties also agree to accept safeguards by the International Atomic Energy Agency (IAEA) to verify that they are not diverting nuclear energy from peaceful uses to nuclear weapons or other nuclear explosive devices (Article III).

The five NWS parties have made undertakings not to use their nuclear weapons against a non-NWS party except in response to a nuclear attack, or a conventional attack in alliance with a Nuclear Weapons State. However, these undertakings have not been incorporated formally into the treaty, and the exact details have varied over time. The U.S. also had nuclear warheads targeted at North Korea, a non-NWS, from 1959 until 1991. The previous United Kingdom Secretary of State for Defence, Geoff Hoon, has also explicitly invoked the possibility of the use of the country's nuclear weapons in response to a non-conventional attack by "rogue states". In January 2006, President Jacques Chirac of France indicated that an incident of state-sponsored terrorism on France could trigger a small-scale nuclear retaliation aimed at destroying the "rogue state's" power centers.

Security provided by extended nuclear deterrence (also known as a nuclear umbrella) has been a factor limiting incentives for some NNWS to acquire nuclear weapons.

=== Second pillar: Disarmament ===
Under Article VI of the NPT, all Parties undertake to pursue good-faith negotiations on effective measures relating to cessation of the nuclear arms race, to nuclear disarmament, and to general and complete disarmament.

Article VI of the NPT represents the only binding commitment in a multilateral treaty to the goal of disarmament by the nuclear-weapon states. The NPT's preamble contains language affirming the desire of treaty signatories to ease international tension and strengthen international trust so as to create someday the conditions for a halt to the production of nuclear weapons, and treaty on general and complete disarmament that liquidates, in particular, nuclear weapons and their delivery vehicles from national arsenals.

The wording of the NPT's Article VI arguably imposes only a vague obligation on all NPT signatories to move in the general direction of nuclear and total disarmament, saying, "Each of the Parties to the Treaty undertakes to pursue negotiations in good faith on effective measures relating to cessation of the nuclear arms race at an early date and to nuclear disarmament, and on a treaty on general and complete disarmament." Under this interpretation, Article VI does not strictly require all signatories to actually conclude a disarmament treaty. Rather, it only requires them "to negotiate in good faith".

However, some governments, especially non-nuclear-weapon states belonging to the Non-Aligned Movement, have interpreted Article VI's language as constituting a formal and specific obligation on the NPT-recognized nuclear-weapon states to disarm themselves of nuclear weapons, and argue that these states have failed to meet their obligation. The International Court of Justice (ICJ), in its advisory opinion on the Legality of the Threat or Use of Nuclear Weapons, issued 8 July 1996, unanimously interprets the text of Article VI as implying that

There exists an obligation to pursue in good faith and bring to a conclusion negotiations leading to nuclear disarmament in all its aspects under strict and effective international control.

The ICJ opinion notes that this obligation involves all NPT parties (not just the nuclear weapon states) and does not suggest a specific time frame for nuclear disarmament.

Critics of the NPT-recognized nuclear-weapon states (the United States, Russia, China, France, and the United Kingdom) sometimes argue that what they view as the failure of the NPT-recognized nuclear weapon states to disarm themselves of nuclear weapons, especially in the post–Cold War era, has angered some non-nuclear-weapon NPT signatories of the NPT. Such failure, these critics add, provides justification for the non-nuclear-weapon signatories to quit the NPT and develop their own nuclear arsenals.

Other observers have suggested that the linkage between proliferation and disarmament may also work the other way, i.e., that the failure to resolve proliferation threats in Iran and North Korea, for instance, will cripple the prospects for disarmament. No current nuclear weapons state, the argument goes, would seriously consider eliminating its last nuclear weapons without high confidence that other countries would not acquire them. Some observers have even suggested that the very progress of disarmament by the superpowers—which has led to the elimination of thousands of weapons and delivery systems—could eventually make the possession of nuclear weapons more attractive by increasing the perceived strategic value of a small arsenal. As one U.S. official and NPT expert warned in 2007, "logic suggests that as the number of nuclear weapons decreases, the 'marginal utility' of a nuclear weapon as an instrument of military power increases. At the extreme, which it is precisely disarmament's hope to create, the strategic utility of even one or two nuclear weapons would be huge."

=== Third pillar: Peaceful use of nuclear energy ===
NPT Article IV acknowledges the right of all Parties to develop nuclear energy for peaceful purposes and to benefit from international cooperation in this area, in conformity with their nonproliferation obligations. Article IV also encourages such cooperation. This so-called third pillar provides for the transfer of nuclear technology and materials to NPT Parties for peaceful purposes in the development of civilian nuclear energy programs in those countries, subject to IAEA safeguards to demonstrate that their nuclear programs are not being used for the development of nuclear weapons.

As the commercially popular light water reactor nuclear power station uses enriched uranium fuel, it follows that states must be able either to enrich uranium or purchase it on an international market. Mohamed ElBaradei, then Director General of the International Atomic Energy Agency, has called the spread of enrichment and reprocessing capabilities the "Achilles' heel" of the nuclear nonproliferation regime. As of 2007, 13 states have an enrichment capability.

During the 1960s and 1970s many states, almost 60, were supplied with research reactors fueled by weapon grade highly enriched uranium (HEU) through the United States Atoms for Peace program and a similar Soviet Union program. In the 1980s a program to convert HEU research reactors to use low enriched fuel was started in the United States due to proliferation concerns. However 26 states possessed more than 1 kg of civilian HEU in 2015, and as of 2016 the stocks of HEU for civilian research were 60 tonnes, with 74 research reactors still using HEU.

Because the availability of fissile material has long been considered the principal obstacle to, and "pacing element" for, a country's nuclear weapons development effort, it was declared a major emphasis of U.S. policy in 2004 to prevent the further spread of uranium enrichment and plutonium reprocessing (a.k.a. "ENR") technology. Countries possessing ENR capabilities, it is feared, have what is in effect the option of using this capability to produce fissile material for weapons use on demand, thus giving them what has been termed a "virtual" nuclear weapons program. The degree to which NPT members have a "right" to ENR technology notwithstanding its potentially grave proliferation implications, therefore, is at the cutting edge of policy and legal debates surrounding the meaning of Article IV and its relation to Articles I, II, and III of the treaty.

Countries that have become Parties to the NPT as non-nuclear-weapon States have a strong record of not building nuclear weapons, although some tried and one eventually left the NPT and acquired nuclear weapons. Iraq was found by the IAEA to have violated its safeguards obligations and subject to punitive sanctions by the UN Security Council. North Korea never came into compliance with its NPT safeguards agreement and was cited repeatedly for these violations, and later withdrew from the NPT and tested multiple nuclear devices. Iran was found in non-compliance with its NPT safeguards obligations in an unusual non-consensus decision because it "failed in a number of instances over an extended period of time" to report aspects of its enrichment program. In 1991, Romania reported previously undeclared nuclear activities by the former regime and the IAEA reported this non-compliance to the Security Council for information only. Libya pursued a clandestine nuclear weapons program before abandoning it in December 2003. The IAEA reported Syria's safeguards non-compliance to the UN Security Council, which did not take action.

In some regions, the fact that all neighbors are verifiably free of nuclear weapons reduces any pressure individual states might feel to build those weapons themselves, even if neighbors are known to have peaceful nuclear energy programs that might otherwise be suspicious. In this, the treaty works as designed.

In 2004, Mohamed ElBaradei said that by some estimates thirty-five to forty states could have the knowledge to develop nuclear weapons.

== Key articles ==
Article I: Each nuclear-weapons state (NWS) undertakes not to transfer, to any recipient, nuclear weapons, or other nuclear explosive devices, and not to assist any non-nuclear weapon state to manufacture or acquire such weapons or devices.

Article II: Each non-NWS party undertakes not to receive, from any source, nuclear weapons, or other nuclear explosive devices; not to manufacture or acquire such weapons or devices; and not to receive any assistance in their manufacture.

Article III: Each non-NWS party undertakes to conclude an agreement with the IAEA for the application of its safeguards to all nuclear material in all of the state's peaceful nuclear activities and to prevent diversion of such material to nuclear weapons or other nuclear explosive devices.

Article IV:

- 1. Nothing in this Treaty shall be interpreted as affecting the inalienable right of all the Parties to the Treaty to develop research, production and use of nuclear energy for peaceful purposes without discrimination and in conformity with Articles I and II of this Treaty.
- 2. All the Parties to the Treaty undertake to facilitate, and have the right to participate in, the fullest possible exchange of equipment, materials and scientific and technological information for the peaceful uses of nuclear energy. Parties to the Treaty in a position to do so shall also co-operate in contributing alone or together with other States or international organizations to the further development of the applications of nuclear energy for peaceful purposes, especially in the territories of non-nuclear-weapon States Party to the Treaty, with due consideration for the needs of the developing areas of the world.

Article VI: Each party "undertakes to pursue negotiations in good faith on effective measures relating to cessation of the nuclear arms race at an early date and to nuclear disarmament, and on a Treaty on general and complete disarmament under strict and effective international control".

Article IX: "For the purposes of this Treaty, a nuclear-weapon State is one which has manufactured and exploded a nuclear weapon or other nuclear explosive device prior to 1 January 1967."

Article X: Establishes the right to withdraw from the Treaty giving 3 months' notice. It also establishes the duration of the Treaty (25 years before 1995 Extension Initiative).

== History ==
Date NPT first effective (including USSR, YU, CS of that time) 1st decade: ratified or acceded 1968–1977 2nd decade: ratified or acceded 1978–1987 3rd decade: ratified or acceded since 1988 Never signed (India, Israel, Pakistan, South Sudan)

The impetus behind the NPT was concern for the safety of a world with many nuclear weapon states. It was recognized that the Cold War deterrent relationship between just the United States and the Soviet Union was fragile. Having more nuclear-weapon states would reduce security for all, multiplying the risks of miscalculation, accidents, unauthorized use of weapons, escalation in tensions, and nuclear conflict. Moreover, since the use of nuclear weapons in Hiroshima and Nagasaki in 1945, it has been apparent that the development of nuclear capabilities by States could enable them to divert technology and materials for weapons purposes. Thus, the problem of preventing such diversions became a central issue in discussions on peaceful uses of nuclear energy.

Initial efforts, which began in 1946, to create an international system enabling all States to have access to nuclear technology under appropriate safeguards, were terminated in 1949 without the achievement of this objective, due to serious political differences between the major Powers. By then, both the United States and the former Soviet Union had tested nuclear weapons, and were beginning to build their stockpiles.

In December 1953, US President Dwight D. Eisenhower, in his "Atoms for Peace" proposal, presented to the eighth session of the United Nations General Assembly, urged that an international organization be established to disseminate peaceful nuclear technology, while guarding against development of weapons capabilities in additional countries. His proposal resulted in 1957 in the establishment of the International Atomic Energy Agency (IAEA), which was charged with the dual responsibility for promotion and control of nuclear technology. IAEA technical activities began in 1958. An interim safeguards system for small nuclear reactors, put in place in 1961, was replaced in 1964 by a system covering larger installations and, over the following years, was expanded to include additional nuclear facilities. In recent years, efforts to strengthen the effectiveness and improve the efficiency of the IAEA safeguards system culminated in the approval of the Model Additional Protocol by the IAEA Board of Governors in May 1997.

Within the framework of the United Nations, the principle of nuclear non-proliferation was addressed in negotiations as early as 1957. The NPT process was launched by Frank Aiken, Irish Minister for External Affairs, in 1958. The NPT gained significant momentum in the early 1960s. The structure of a treaty to uphold nuclear non-proliferation as a norm of international behaviour had become clear by the mid-1960s, and by 1968 final agreement had been reached on a Treaty that would prevent the proliferation of nuclear weapons, enable cooperation for the peaceful use of nuclear energy, and further the goal of achieving nuclear disarmament. It was opened for signature in 1968, with Finland the first State to sign. Accession became nearly universal after the end of the Cold War and of South African apartheid. In 1992, The People's Republic of China and France acceded to the NPT, the last of the five nuclear powers recognized by the treaty to do so.

The treaty provided, in article X, for a conference to be convened 25 years after its entry into force to decide whether the treaty should continue in force indefinitely, or be extended for an additional fixed period or periods. Accordingly, at the NPT Review and Extension Conference in May 1995, state parties to the treaty agreed—without a vote—on the treaty's indefinite extension, and decided that review conferences should continue to be held every five years. After Brazil acceded to the NPT in 1998, the only remaining non-nuclear-weapon state which had not signed was Cuba, which joined the NPT (and the Treaty of Tlatelolco nuclear-weapon-free zone) in 2002.

Several NPT states parties have given up nuclear weapons or nuclear weapons programs. South Africa undertook a nuclear weapons program, but has since renounced it and acceded to the treaty in 1991 after destroying its small nuclear arsenal; after this, the remaining African countries signed the treaty.

The former Soviet Republics where nuclear weapons had been based, namely Ukraine, Belarus and Kazakhstan, transferred those weapons to Russia and joined the NPT by 1994 following the signature of the Budapest Memorandum on Security Assurances.

Successor states from the Breakup of Yugoslavia and Dissolution of Czechoslovakia also joined the treaty soon after their independence. Montenegro and East Timor were the last countries to accede to the treaty on their independence in 2006 and 2003; the only other country to accede in the 21st century was Cuba in 2002. The three Micronesian countries in Compact of Free Association with the USA joined the NPT in 1995, alongside Vanuatu.

Major South American countries Argentina, Chile, and Brazil joined in 1995 and 1998. Arabian Peninsula countries included Saudi Arabia and Bahrain in 1988, Qatar and Kuwait in 1989, UAE in 1995, and Oman in 1997. The European states of Monaco and Andorra joined in 1995–6. Also acceding in the 1990s were Myanmar in 1992 and Guyana in 1993.

=== United States–NATO nuclear weapons sharing ===
Nuclear-Weapon-Free Zones Nuclear weapons states Nuclear sharing Neither, but NPT

At the time the treaty was being negotiated, NATO had in place secret nuclear weapons sharing agreements whereby the United States provided nuclear weapons to be deployed by, and stored in, other NATO states. Some argue this is an act of proliferation violating Articles I and II of the treaty. A counter-argument is that the U.S. controlled the weapons in storage within the NATO states, and that no transfer of the weapons or control over them was intended "unless and until a decision were made to go to war, at which the treaty would no longer be controlling", so there is no breach of the NPT. These agreements were disclosed to a few of the states, including the Soviet Union, negotiating the treaty, but most of the states that signed the NPT in 1968 would not have known about these agreements and interpretations at that time.

As of 2005, it is estimated that the United States still provides about 180 tactical B61 nuclear bombs for use by Belgium, Germany, Italy, the Netherlands and Turkey under these NATO agreements. Many states, and the Non-Aligned Movement, now argue this violates Articles I and II of the treaty, and are applying diplomatic pressure to terminate these agreements. They point out that the pilots and other staff of the "non-nuclear" NATO states practice handling and delivering the U.S. nuclear bombs, and non-U.S. warplanes have been adapted to deliver U.S. nuclear bombs which must have involved the transfer of some technical nuclear weapons information. NATO believes its "nuclear forces continue to play an essential role in war prevention, but their role is now more fundamentally political".

U.S. nuclear sharing policies were originally designed to help prevent the proliferation of nuclear weapons—not least by persuading West Germany not to develop an independent nuclear capability by assuring it that West Germany would be able, in the event of war with the Warsaw Pact, to wield (U.S.) nuclear weapons in self-defense. (Until that point of all-out war, however, the weapons themselves would remain in U.S. hands.) The point was to limit the spread of countries having their own nuclear weapons programs, helping ensure that NATO allies would not choose to go down the proliferation route. (West Germany was discussed in U.S. intelligence estimates for a number of years as being a country with the potential to develop nuclear weapons capabilities of its own if officials in Bonn were not convinced that their defense against the Soviet Union and its allies could otherwise be met.)

=== Russia's weapon deployment in Belarus ===
On 27 February 2022, shortly after the 2022 Russian invasion of Ukraine, a referendum was staged in Belarus to remove a constitutional prohibition on basing nuclear weapons on its territory. On 25 June 2022, President of Belarus Lukashenko met Russian President Putin to discuss the deployment of Russian short-range nuclear-capable missiles on the territory of Belarus. The transfer of nuclear warheads would require a further decision, possibly after a number of years, and could be tied to future NATO decisions.

In Belarus, Russia plans to deploy nuclear-capable Iskander-M missile systems. Both conventional and nuclear versions of the missile would be provided under the plans. Additionally, Putin said that he would facilitate the modifications necessary for Belarusian Su-25 bombers to carry nuclear missiles.

On 14 June 2023, president Lukashenko said that Russia had started moving tactical nuclear weapons into Belarus's territory. The Russian president had said the weapons were moved "as a deterrence measure" against threats to Russian statehood, and would not be controlled by Belarus. NATO saw no evidence in a change in Russia's nuclear position, and in June 2023 Ukrainian intelligence said that not a single warhead had yet been transferred.

However, by March 2024, reports seemed to confirm that Russian nuclear weapons are now hosted on Belarusian territory. Even so, contemporaneous reports remained reticent to draw the definite conclusion that deployment had already occurred. In any case, by the end of 2024, president Lukashenko requested the deployment of nuclear-capable, Russian Oreshnik intermediate range ballistic missile; Putin confirmed the possibility of the missiles' deployment by the end of 2025.

== Non-parties ==
Four states—India, Israel, Pakistan, and South Sudan—have never signed the treaty. India and Pakistan have publicly disclosed their nuclear weapon programs, and Israel has a long-standing policy of deliberate ambiguity with regards to its nuclear program (see List of states with nuclear weapons).

=== India ===
India has detonated nuclear devices, first in 1974 and again in 1998. It is estimated to have enough fissile material for more than 150 warheads and was among the few countries to have a no first use policy, a pledge not to use nuclear weapons unless first attacked by an adversary using nuclear weapons. However, India's former National Security Advisor (NSA) Shivshankar Menon signaled a significant shift in a October 2010 speech from "no first use" to "no first use against non-nuclear weapon states", a doctrine Menon said reflected India's "strategic culture, with its emphasis on minimal deterrence".

India argues that the NPT creates a club of "nuclear haves" and a larger group of "nuclear have-nots" by restricting the legal possession of nuclear weapons to those states that tested them before 1967, but the treaty never explains on what ethical grounds such a distinction is valid. India's then External Affairs Minister Pranab Mukherjee said during a visit to Tokyo in 2007: "If India did not sign the NPT, it is not because of its lack of commitment for non-proliferation, but because we consider NPT as a flawed treaty and it did not recognize the need for universal, non-discriminatory verification and treatment." Although there have been unofficial discussions on creating a South Asian nuclear weapons free zone, including India and Pakistan, this is considered to be highly unlikely for the foreseeable future.

In early March 2006, India and the United States finalized an agreement, in the face of criticism in both countries, to restart cooperation on civilian nuclear technology. Under the deal India has committed to classify 14 of its 22 nuclear power plants as being for civilian use and to place them under IAEA safeguards. Mohamed ElBaradei, then Director General of the IAEA, welcomed the deal by calling India "an important partner in the non-proliferation regime."

In December 2006, United States Congress approved the United States-India Peaceful Atomic Energy Cooperation Act, endorsing a deal that was forged during Prime Minister Manmohan Singh's visit to the United States in July 2005 and cemented during President Bush's visit to India earlier in 2006. The legislation allows for the transfer of civilian nuclear material to India. Despite its status outside the Nuclear Non-Proliferation Treaty, nuclear cooperation with India was permitted on the basis of its clean non-proliferation record, and India's need for energy fueled by its rapid industrialization and a billion-plus population.

On 1 August 2008, the IAEA approved the India Safeguards Agreement and on 6 September 2008, India was granted the waiver at the Nuclear Suppliers Group (NSG) meeting held in Vienna, Austria. The consensus was arrived after overcoming misgivings expressed by Austria, Ireland and New Zealand and is an unprecedented step in giving exemption to a country which has not signed the NPT and the Comprehensive Nuclear-Test-Ban Treaty (CTBT). While India could commence nuclear trade with other willing countries. The U.S. Congress approved this agreement and President Bush signed it on 8 October 2008.

When China announced expanded nuclear cooperation with Pakistan in 2010, proponents of arms control denounced both the deals, claiming that they weakened the NPT by facilitating nuclear programmes in states which are not parties to the NPT.

==== Uranium sales from Australia ====
As of January 2011, Australia, a top three uranium producer and home to the world's largest known reserves, had continued its refusal to export uranium to India despite diplomatic pressure from India.

In November 2011, Australian Prime Minister Julia Gillard announced a desire to allow exports to India, a policy change which was authorized by her party's national conference in December. The following month, Gillard overturned Australia's long-standing ban on exporting uranium to India. She further said, "We should take a decision in the national interest, a decision about strengthening our strategic partnership with India in this the Asian century," and said that any agreement to sell uranium to India would include strict safeguards to ensure it would only be used for civilian purposes, and not end up in nuclear weapons.

On 5 September 2014 Tony Abbott, Gillard's successor as Australian Prime Minister, sealed a civil nuclear deal to sell uranium to India. "We signed a nuclear cooperation agreement because Australia trusts India to do the right thing in this area, as it has been doing in other areas," Abbott told reporters after he and Indian Prime Minister Narendra Modi signed a pact to sell uranium for peaceful power generation.

=== Pakistan ===
In May 1998, following India's nuclear tests earlier that month, Pakistan conducted two sets of nuclear tests, the Chagai-I and Chagai-II. Although there is little confirmed information in public, as of 2015, Pakistan was estimated to have as many as 120 warheads. According to analyses of the Carnegie Endowment for International Peace and the Stimson Center, Pakistan has enough fissile material for 350 warheads.

Pakistani officials argue that the NPT is discriminatory. When asked at a briefing in 2015 whether Islamabad would sign the NPT if Washington requested it, Foreign Secretary Aizaz Ahmad Chaudhry was quoted as responding "It is a discriminatory treaty. Pakistan has the right to defend itself, so Pakistan will not sign the NPT. Why should we?" Until 2010, Pakistan had always maintained the position that it would sign the NPT if India did so. In 2010, Pakistan abandoned this historic position and stated that it would join the NPT only as a recognized nuclear-weapon state.

The NSG Guidelines currently rule out nuclear exports by all major suppliers to Pakistan, with very narrow exceptions, since it does not have full-scope IAEA safeguards (i.e. safeguards on all its nuclear activities). Pakistan has sought to reach an agreement similar to that with India, but these efforts have been rebuffed by the United States and other NSG members, on the grounds that Pakistan's track record as a nuclear proliferator makes it impossible for it to have any sort of nuclear deal in the near future.

By 2010, China reportedly signed a civil nuclear agreement with Pakistan, using the justification that the deal was "peaceful". The British government criticized this, on the grounds that "the time is not yet right for a civil nuclear deal with Pakistan". China did not seek formal approval from the nuclear suppliers group, and claimed instead that its cooperation with Pakistan was "grandfathered" when China joined the NSG, a claim that was disputed by other NSG members. Pakistan applied for membership on 19 May 2016, supported by Turkey and China. However, many NSG members opposed Pakistan's membership bid due to its track record, including the illicit procurement network of Pakistani scientist A.Q. Khan, which aided the nuclear programs of Iran, Libya and North Korea. Pakistani officials reiterated the request in August 2016.

=== Israel ===
Israel has a long-standing policy of deliberate ambiguity with regards to its nuclear program (see List of countries with nuclear weapons). Israel has been developing nuclear technology at its Dimona site in the Negev since 1958, and some nonproliferation analysts estimate that Israel may have stockpiled between 100 and 200 warheads using reprocessed plutonium. The position on the NPT is explained in terms of "Israeli exceptionality", a term coined by Professor Gerald M. Steinberg, in reference to the perception that the country's small size, overall vulnerability, as well as the history of deep hostility and large-scale attacks by neighboring states, require a deterrent capability.

The Israeli government refuses to confirm or deny possession of nuclear weapons, although this is now regarded as an open secret after Israeli junior nuclear technician Mordechai Vanunu—subsequently arrested and sentenced for treason by Israel—published evidence about the program to the British Sunday Times in 1986.

On 18 September 2009, the General Conference of the International Atomic Energy Agency called on Israel to open its nuclear facilities to IAEA inspection and adhere to the non-proliferation treaty as part of a resolution on "Israeli nuclear capabilities", which passed by a narrow margin of 49–45 with 16 abstentions. The chief Israeli delegate stated that "Israel will not co-operate in any matter with this resolution." However, similar resolutions were defeated in 2010, 2013, 2014, and 2015. As with Pakistan, the NSG Guidelines currently rule out nuclear exports by all major suppliers to Israel.

=== South Sudan ===
The draft final document of the 2022 NPT Review Conference reaffirmed the importance of universality of the Treaty and "call[ed] upon South Sudan to accede, as soon as possible, to the Treaty." This document was not adopted because of Russian objections to text related to Ukraine. On 2 December 2024, the United Nations General Assembly adopted a resolution that "calls upon South Sudan to join the Treaty at the earliest opportunity".

== Other states ==
=== North Korea ===
North Korea acceded to the treaty on 12 December 1985 in order to obtain assistance from the Soviet Union in the construction of four light-water reactors, but was found to be in noncompliance with its IAEA safeguards agreement after a series of inspections in 1992-93 which determined that North Korea had not fully declared its history of reprocessing spent fuel at the Yongbyon nuclear facility. North Korea responded by announcing its intent to withdraw from the treaty on 12 March 1993, and President Bill Clinton responded by announcing sanctions and considering military action. The crisis ended with the Agreed Framework negotiated by former US President Jimmy Carter in which North Korea agreed to an IAEA-monitored freeze of plutonium production facilities and construction of new reactors in exchange for two light-water reactors and heavy fuel oil shipments through the US-led Korean Peninsula Energy Development Organization consortium. North Korea also abandoned its withdrawal from the NPT.

During the late 1990s and the early 2000s critics of the agreement, as well as Clinton's successor George W. Bush, expressed skepticism on North Korean compliance to the Agreed Framework. During 2002 negotiations US Assistant Secretary of State James A. Kelly accused North Korea of a secret highly enriched uranium program; North Korean First Vice Foreign Minister Kang Sok-ju and Vice Foreign Minister Kim Kye-gwan responded by denying the allegations but asserting that North Korea had a right to nuclear weapons. The U.S. subsequently halted fuel oil shipments to North Korea in December 2002 and the DPRK government again gave notice of withdrawal from NPT on 10 January 2003. The withdrawal became effective 10 April 2003, making North Korea the first state ever to withdraw from the treaty.

In April 2003, North Korea agreed to the multilateral six-party talks to find a diplomatic solution to the issue hosted by China and including the United States, South Korea, Russia, and Japan. North Korea initially demanded resumption of fuel shipments, while the United States demanded the "complete, verifiable, and irreversible dismantlement" of the North Korean nuclear program. On 10 February 2005, North Korea publicly declared that it possessed nuclear weapons and pulled out of the six-party talks. "We had already taken the resolute action of pulling out of the Nuclear Non-Proliferation Treaty and have manufactured nuclear arms for self-defence to cope with the Bush administration's evermore undisguised policy to isolate and stifle the DPRK [Democratic People's Republic of Korea]," a North Korean Foreign Ministry statement said regarding the issue. Six-party talks resumed in July 2005.

On 19 September 2005, North Korea announced that it would agree to a preliminary accord. Under the accord, North Korea would scrap all of its existing nuclear weapons and nuclear production facilities, rejoin the NPT, and readmit IAEA inspectors. The difficult issue of the supply of light water reactors to replace North Korea's indigenous nuclear power plant program, as per the 1994 Agreed Framework, was left to be resolved in future discussions. On the next day North Korea reiterated its known view that until it is supplied with a light water reactor it will not dismantle its nuclear arsenal or rejoin the NPT. The six-party talks eventually collapsed before a final agreement could be negotiated after the U.S. State Department sanctioned Banco Delta Asia under Section 311 of the Patriot Act for money-laundering involving North Korean accounts.

On 2 October 2006, the North Korean foreign minister announced that his country was planning to conduct a nuclear test "in the future", although it did not state when. On Monday, 9 October 2006 at 01:35:28 (UTC) the United States Geological Survey detected a magnitude 4.3 seismic event 70 km (43 mi) north of Kimchaek, North Korea indicating a nuclear test. The North Korean government announced shortly afterward that they had completed a successful underground test of a nuclear fission device. After United Nations Security Council Resolution 1718 imposed sanctions on North Korea, the six-party talks resumed. In February 2007 the parties agreed to the Initial Actions for the Implementation for the Joint Statement in which North Korea would dismantle its nuclear weapons programs, including the Yongbyon reactor, in exchange for the return of frozen funds at Banco Delta Asia and foreign energy assistance. However, the agreement failed due to verification problems and North Korea fully withdrew from the six-party talks in 2009 after the other members condemned the 2009 North Korean missile tests, expelling all US and IAEA inspectors from the country. The UN responded by adopting United Nations Security Council Resolution 1874 expanding the sanctions regime.

In 2007, reports from Washington suggested that the 2002 CIA reports stating that North Korea was developing an enriched uranium weapons program, which led to North Korea leaving the NPT, had overstated or misread the intelligence. However, even apart from these press allegations, there remains some information in the public record indicating the existence of a uranium effort. Quite apart from the fact that North Korean First Vice Minister Kang Sok-ju at one point admitted the existence of a uranium enrichment program, Pakistan's then-President Musharraf revealed that the A.Q. Khan proliferation network had provided North Korea with a number of gas centrifuges designed for uranium enrichment. Additionally, press reports have cited U.S. officials to the effect that evidence obtained in dismantling Libya's WMD programs points toward North Korea as the source for Libya's uranium hexafluoride (UF_{6})—which, if true, would mean that North Korea has a uranium conversion facility for producing feedstock for centrifuge enrichment. North Korea formally announced the existence of a uranium enrichment program in September 2009.

In 2011, after rising tensions over the North Korean nuclear program, the ROKS Cheonan sinking, and the bombardment of Yeonpyeong, North Korea began to express interest in returning to the six-party talks. Bilateral negotiations between North Korea and the United States after the death of Kim Jong-il led to the 29 February 2012 "Leap Day Agreement" in which North Korea would agree to allow IAEA inspections and resume the six-party talks. However, these diplomatic gains were quickly undercut by launching the Unha-3 rocket, leading the United States to suspend food aid. North Korea conducted further nuclear tests in 2013, January 2016, September 2016, and 2017, and announced that it was developing miniaturized warheads and intercontinental ballistic missiles. It also claimed that it had successfully detonated thermonuclear weapons in the January 2016 and 2017 tests. The North Korean nuclear weapons development led to the 2017–2018 North Korea crisis which nearly led to war, with both North Korean Supreme Leader Kim Jong-un and US President Donald Trump threatening military action. The crisis was averted after a series of meetings between Kim Jong-un, US Secretary of State Mike Pompeo, and South Korean President Moon Jae-in finally culminating with the 2018 North Korea–United States Singapore Summit between Trump and Kim, the first face-to-face meeting between the US and North Korean heads of state. The IAEA has called for North Korea to rejoin it and the NPT since 2013.

=== Iran ===
Iran is a party to the NPT since 1970, but was found in non-compliance with its NPT safeguards agreement, and the status of its nuclear program remains in dispute. In November 2003 IAEA Director General Mohamed ElBaradei reported that Iran had repeatedly and over an extended period failed to meet its safeguards obligations under the NPT with respect to:

- reporting of nuclear material imported to Iran;
- reporting of the subsequent processing and use of imported nuclear material;
- declaring of facilities and other locations where nuclear material had been stored and processed.

After about two years of EU3-led diplomatic efforts and Iran temporarily suspending its enrichment program, the IAEA Board of Governors, acting under Article XII.C of the IAEA Statute, found in a rare non-consensus decision with 12 abstentions that these failures constituted non-compliance with the IAEA safeguards agreement. This was reported to the UN Security Council in 2006, after which the Security Council passed a resolution demanding that Iran suspend its enrichment. Instead, Iran resumed its enrichment program.

The IAEA has been able to verify the non-diversion of declared nuclear material in Iran, and is continuing its work on verifying the absence of undeclared activities. In February 2008, the IAEA also reported that it was working to address "alleged studies" of weaponization, based on documents provided by certain Member States, which those states claimed originated from Iran. Iran rejected the allegations as "baseless" and the documents as "fabrications". In June 2009, the IAEA reported that Iran had not "cooperated with the Agency in connection with the remaining issues ... which need to be clarified to exclude the possibility of military dimensions to Iran's nuclear program."

The United States concluded that Iran violated its Article III NPT safeguards obligations, and further argued based on circumstantial evidence that Iran's enrichment program was for weapons purposes and therefore violated Iran's Article II nonproliferation obligations. The November 2007 US National Intelligence Estimate (NIE) later concluded with "only moderate" confidence, that Iran had halted a nuclear weapons program in the fall of 2003 "primarily in response to increasing international scrutiny and pressure resulting from exposure of [its] previously undeclared nuclear work", with "moderate" confidence that it "probably would be technically capable of producing enough highly enriched uranium for a weapon sometime during the 2010-2015 time frame [with a lower level of confidence for weapon amounts of reprocessed plutonium in that time]", and had not restarted those activities as of mid-2007, represented "a halt to [its] entire nuclear weapons program."

While describing the NIE's assessment of Iran's nuclear weapons program status as "offer[ing] a ray of hope", U.S. Special Representative for Nuclear Non-proliferation Christopher A. Ford was not convinced that Iran should be trusted to accumulate fissile material in the future, "the principal obstacle that stands between it and nuclear weaponry." Ford emphasized the rapid growth of Iran's uranium enrichment program at Natanz, that it had "remained committed to developing full-scale enrichment, and [was] pressing ahead with UNSC-proscribed activities", and presumably, through his reference to plutonium reprocessing, its continued work on a heavy water reactor at Arak, which was begun covertly years before in conjunction with the very weaponization work that the NIE discussed. "More international scrutiny and pressure [was] needed to ensure [Iran's] effort [could not] be restarted". As The Bush Administration's Director of National Intelligence (DNI) Mike McConnell put it in 2008, the aspects of its work that Iran allegedly suspended were thus "probably the least significant part of the program."

Iran stated it has a legal right to enrich uranium for peaceful purposes under the NPT, and further says that it had "constantly complied with its obligations under the NPT and the Statute of the International Atomic Energy Agency". Iran also stated that its enrichment program has been part of its civilian nuclear energy program, which is allowed under Article IV of the NPT. The Non-Aligned Movement has welcomed the continuing cooperation of Iran with the IAEA and reaffirmed Iran's right to the peaceful uses of nuclear technology.

Early during his tenure as United Nations Secretary General, between 2007 and 2016, Ban Ki-moon welcomed the continued dialogue between Iran and the IAEA. He urged a peaceful resolution of the issue.

In April 2010, during the signing of the U.S.-Russia New START Treaty, President Obama said that the United States, Russia, and other nations were demanding that Iran face consequences for failing to fulfill its obligations under the Nuclear Non-Proliferation Treaty, saying "We will not tolerate actions that flout the NPT, risk an arms race in a vital region, and threaten the credibility of the international community and our collective security."

In 2010, Ali Khamenei issued a fatwa declaring the use of nuclear weapons as forbidden by Islam and stated that Iran was not pursuing them.

In 2015, Iran negotiated a nuclear deal with the P5+1, a group of countries that consisted of the five permanent members of the UN Security Council (China, France, Russia, the United Kingdom, and the United States) plus Germany. On 14 July 2015, the P5+1 and Iran concluded the Joint Comprehensive Plan of Action (JCPOA), lifting sanctions on Iran in exchange for constraints and on Iran's nuclear activities and increased verification by the IAEA.

On 8 May 2018, President Donald Trump withdrew the United States from the JCPOA and reimposed sanctions on Iran.

On 16 June 2025, as a result of the Twelve-Day War, Iran announced that its parliament was drafting a bill to withdraw from the NPT. In March 2026, the state-run Tasnim media outlet called for leaving the treaty as soon as possible. On 30 March, an Iranian lawmaker said that a vote would be taking place on withdrawal "if conditions allow."

=== South Africa ===
South Africa is the only country that developed nuclear weapons by itself and later dismantled them—unlike the former Soviet states Ukraine, Belarus and Kazakhstan, which inherited nuclear weapons from the former USSR and also acceded to the NPT as non-nuclear weapon states.

During the days of apartheid, the South African government developed a deep fear of both a black uprising and the threat of communism. This led to the development of a secret nuclear weapons program as an ultimate deterrent. South Africa has a large supply of uranium, which is mined in the country's gold mines. The government built a nuclear research facility at Pelindaba near Pretoria where uranium was enriched to fuel grade for the Koeberg Nuclear Power Station as well as weapon grade for bomb production.

In 1991, after international pressure and when a change of government was imminent, South African Ambassador to the United States Harry Schwarz signed the Nuclear Non-Proliferation Treaty. In 1993, the then president Frederik Willem de Klerk openly admitted that the country had developed a limited nuclear weapon capability. These weapons were subsequently dismantled before South Africa acceded to the NPT and opened itself up to IAEA inspection. In 1994, the IAEA completed its work and declared that the country had fully dismantled its nuclear weapons program.

=== Libya ===
Libya had signed (in 1968) and ratified (in 1975) the Nuclear Non-Proliferation Treaty and was subject to IAEA nuclear safeguards inspections, but undertook a secret nuclear weapons development program in violation of its NPT obligations, using material and technology provided by the A.Q. Khan proliferation network—including actual nuclear weapons designs allegedly originating in China. Libya began secret negotiations with the United States and the United Kingdom in March 2003 over potentially eliminating its WMD programs. In October 2003, Libya was embarrassed by the interdiction of a shipment of Pakistani-designed centrifuge parts sent from Malaysia, also as part of A. Q. Khan's proliferation ring.

In December 2003, Libya announced that it had agreed to eliminate all its WMD programs, and permitted U.S. and British teams (as well as IAEA inspectors) into the country to assist this process and verify its completion. The nuclear weapons designs, gas centrifuges for uranium enrichment, and other equipment—including prototypes for improved SCUD ballistic missiles—were removed from Libya by the United States. (Libyan chemical weapons stocks and chemical bombs were also destroyed on site with international verification, with Libya joining the Chemical Weapons Convention.) Libya's non-compliance with its IAEA safeguards was reported to the U.N. Security Council, but with no action taken, as Libya's return to compliance with safeguards and Article II of the NPT was welcomed.

In 2011, the Libyan government of Muammar al-Gaddafi was overthrown in the Libyan Civil War with the assistance of a military intervention by NATO forces acting under the auspices of UN Security Council Resolution 1973. Gaddafi's downfall 8 years after the disarmament of Libya, in which Gaddafi agreed to eliminate Libya's nuclear weapons program, has been repeatedly cited by North Korea, which views Gaddafi's fate as a "cautionary tale" that influences North Korea's decision to maintain and intensify its nuclear weapons program and arsenal despite pressure to denuclearize.

=== Syria ===
Syria is a state party to the NPT since 1969 and has a limited civil nuclear program. Before the advent of the Syrian Civil War it was known to operate only one small Chinese-built research reactor, SRR-1. Despite being a proponent of a Weapons of Mass Destruction Free Zone in the Middle East the country was accused of pursuing a military nuclear program with a reported nuclear facility in a desert Deir ez-Zor Governorate. The reactor's components had likely been designed and manufactured in North Korea, with the reactor's striking similarity in shape and size to the North Korean Yongbyon Nuclear Scientific Research Center. That information alarmed Israeli military and intelligence to such a degree that the idea of a targeted airstrike was conceived. It resulted in Operation Orchard, that took place on 6 September 2007 and saw as many as eight Israeli Air Force aircraft taking part. The Israeli government is said to have bounced the idea of the operation off of the US Bush administration, although the latter declined to participate. The nuclear reactor was destroyed in the attack, which also killed about ten North Korean workers. The attack did not cause an international outcry or any serious Syrian retaliatory moves as both parties tried to keep it secret: Despite a half-century state of war declared by surrounding states, Israel did not want publicity as regards its breach of the ceasefire, while Syria was not willing to acknowledge its clandestine nuclear program.

=== Ukraine ===
Ukraine acceded to the NPT in 1994 as a non-nuclear-weapon state, and committed to remove all former Soviet nuclear weapons from its territory. In recognition of Ukraine's decision, the UK, the United States and Russia provided security assurances to Ukraine under the Budapest Memorandum of 1994.

In 1993, political scientist John Mearsheimer argued that the United States should encourage Ukraine to retain a nuclear deterrent against potential Russian expansion, and to reduce the danger of war. After the Russian invasion of 2014, Andreas Umland, an analyst from the Swedish Institute of International Affairs, argued that Ukraine had been unwise to give up its arsenal, as the war demonstrated that only a nuclear arsenal guarantees a country's sovereignty in the face of aggression from a nuclear power. Mariana Budjeryn of Harvard Kennedy School's Belfer Center, argued that it was unclear whether Ukraine's nuclear arsenal would have kept it safe from Russian aggression. Establishing operative control and maintaining the missiles would have been challenging for Ukraine, which might have faced sanctions had it refused to give up its arsenal.

== Leaving the treaty ==
Article X allows a state to leave the treaty if "extraordinary events, related to the subject matter of this Treaty, have jeopardized the supreme interests of its country", giving three months' (ninety days') notice. The state is required to give reasons for leaving the NPT in this notice.

North Korea has also caused an uproar by its use of this provision of the treaty. Article X.1 only requires a state to give three months' notice in total, and does not provide for other states to question a state's interpretation of "supreme interests of its country". In 1993, North Korea gave notice to withdraw from the NPT. However, after 89 days, North Korea reached agreement with the United States to freeze its nuclear program under the Agreed Framework and "suspended" its withdrawal notice. In October 2002, the United States accused North Korea of violating the Agreed Framework by pursuing a secret uranium enrichment program, and suspended shipments of heavy fuel oil under that agreement. In response, North Korea expelled IAEA inspectors, disabled IAEA equipment, and, on 10 January 2003, announced that it was ending the suspension of its previous NPT withdrawal notification. North Korea said that only one more day's notice was sufficient for withdrawal from the NPT, as it had given 89 days before.

The IAEA Board of Governors rejected this interpretation. Most countries held that a new three-months withdrawal notice was required, and some questioned whether North Korea's notification met the "extraordinary events" and "supreme interests" requirements of the treaty. The Joint Statement of 19 September 2005 at the end of the Fourth Round of the Six-Party Talks called for North Korea to "return" to the NPT, implicitly acknowledging that it had withdrawn.

== Recent and coming events ==
The main outcome of the 2000 Conference was the adoption by consensus of a comprehensive Final Document, which included among other things "practical steps for the systematic and progressive efforts" to implement the disarmament provisions of the NPT, commonly referred to as the Thirteen Steps.

On 18 July 2005, US President George W. Bush met Indian Prime Minister Manmohan Singh and declared that he would work to change US law and international rules to permit trade in US civilian nuclear technology with India. At the time, British columnist George Monbiot argued that the U.S.-India nuclear deal, in combination with US attempts to deny Iran (an NPT signatory) civilian nuclear fuel-making technology, might destroy the NPT regime.

Map of nuclear-armed states of the world NPT-designated nuclear weapon states (China, France, Russia, United Kingdom, United States) Other states with declared nuclear weapons (India, North Korea, Pakistan) Other states presumed to have nuclear weapons (Israel) States that host nuclear weapons under nuclear weapons sharing arrangements as part of NATO (Belgium, Germany, Italy, the Netherlands, Turkey) or with Russia (Belarus). States formerly possessing nuclear weapons (Kazakhstan, South Africa, Ukraine)

In the first half of 2010, it was strongly believed that China had signed a civilian nuclear deal with Pakistan claiming that the deal was "peaceful".

Arms control advocates criticised the reported China-Pakistan deal as they did in case of U.S.-India deal claiming that both the deals violate the NPT by facilitating nuclear programmes in states which are not parties to the NPT. Some reports asserted that the deal was a strategic move by China to balance US influence in South-Asia.

According to a report published by U.S. Department of Defense in 2001, China had provided Pakistan with nuclear materials and has given critical technological assistance in the construction of Pakistan's nuclear weapons development facilities, in violation of the Nuclear Non-Proliferation Treaty, of which China even then was a signatory.

At the Seventh Review Conference in May 2005, there were stark differences between the United States, which wanted the conference to focus on non-proliferation, especially on its allegations against Iran, and most other countries, who emphasized the lack of serious nuclear disarmament by the nuclear powers. The non-aligned countries reiterated their position emphasizing the need for nuclear disarmament.

The 2010 Review Conference was held in May 2010 in New York City, and adopted a final document that included a summary by the Review Conference President, Ambassador Libran Capactulan of the Philippines, and an Action Plan that was adopted by consensus. The 2010 conference was generally considered a success because it reached consensus where the previous Review Conference in 2005 ended in disarray. Many attributed the success of the 2010 conference to U.S. president Barack Obama's commitment to nuclear nonproliferation and disarmament. Some have warned that this success raised unrealistically high expectations that could lead to failure at the next Review Conference in 2015.

The "Global Summit on Nuclear Security" took place 12–13 April 2010. The summit was proposed by President Obama in Prague and was intended to strengthen the Nuclear Non-Proliferation Treaty in conjunction with the Proliferation Security Initiative and the Global Initiative to Combat Nuclear Terrorism. Forty seven states and three international organizations took part in the summit, which issued a communiqué and a work plan. For further information see 2010 Nuclear Security Summit.

UN vote on adoption of the Treaty on the Prohibition of Nuclear Weapons on 7 July 2017 Yes No Did not vote

In a major policy speech at the Brandenburg Gate in Berlin on 19 June 2013, Obama outlined plans to further reduce the number of warheads in the U.S. nuclear arsenal. According to Foreign Policy, Obama proposed a "one-third reduction in strategic nuclear warheads—on top of the cuts already required by the New START treaty—bringing the number of deployed warheads to about 1,000". Obama is seeking to "negotiate these reductions with Russia to continue to move beyond Cold War nuclear postures," according to briefing documents provided to Foreign Policy. In the same speech, Obama emphasized his administration's efforts to isolate any nuclear weapons capabilities emanating from Iran and North Korea. He also called for a renewed bipartisan effort in the United States Congress to ratify the Comprehensive Nuclear-Test-Ban Treaty and called on countries to negotiate a new treaty to end the production of fissile material for nuclear weapons.

On 24 April 2014, it was announced that the nation of the Marshall Islands has brought suit in The Hague against the United States, the former Soviet Union, the United Kingdom, France, China, India, Pakistan, North Korea and Israel seeking to have the disarmament provisions of the NPT enforced.

The 2015 Review Conference of the Parties to the Treaty on the Non-Proliferation of Nuclear Weapons (NPT) was held at the United Nations in New York from 27 April to 22 May 2015 and presided over by Ambassador Taous Feroukhi of Algeria. The Treaty, particularly article VIII, paragraph 3, envisages a review of the operation of the Treaty every five years, a provision which was reaffirmed by the States parties at the 1995 NPT Review and Extension Conference and the 2000 NPT Review Conference. At the 2015 NPT Review Conference, States parties examined the implementation of the Treaty's provisions since 2010. Despite intensive consultations, the Conference was not able to reach agreement on the substantive part of the draft Final Document.

The Tenth Review Conference convened 1–26 August 2022, after a two-year postponement due to the COVID-19 pandemic, and concluded without adopting a final document. Contentious negotiations came close to consensus on a text, but ultimately Russia blocked consensus over issues related to its invasion of Ukraine, including references to the safety of the Zaporizhzhia Nuclear Power Plant in the draft text.

On 23 June 2023, The US Department of State issued a statement that the United States hosted the meeting on 13–14 June in Cairo among the five nuclear weapons states, describing it as "an ongoing exchange in the context of the Nuclear Non-Proliferation Treaty (NPT)."

The Eleventh Review Conference convened 27 April to 22 May 2026 at United Nations Headquarters in New York, and concluded without adopting a final document.

== Criticism and responses ==
Over the years the NPT has come to be seen by many Third World states as "a conspiracy of the nuclear 'haves' to keep the nuclear 'have-nots' in their place". This argument has roots in Article VI of the treaty which "obligates the nuclear weapons states to liquidate their nuclear stockpiles and pursue complete disarmament. The non-nuclear states see no signs of this happening". Some argue that the NWS have not fully complied with their disarmament obligations under Article VI of the NPT. Some countries such as India have criticized the NPT, because it "discriminated against states not possessing nuclear weapons on 1 January 1967," while Iran and numerous Arab states have criticized Israel for not signing the NPT. There has been disappointment with the limited progress on nuclear disarmament, where the five authorized nuclear weapons states still have 13,400 warheads (as of February 2021) among them.

As noted above, the International Court of Justice, in its advisory opinion on the Legality of the Threat or Use of Nuclear Weapons, stated that "there exists an obligation to pursue in good faith and bring to a conclusion negotiations leading to nuclear disarmament in all its aspects under strict and effective international control". Some critics of the nuclear-weapons states contend that they have failed to comply with Article VI by failing to make disarmament the driving force in national planning and policy with respect to nuclear weapons, even while they ask other states to plan for their security without nuclear weapons.

The United States responds to criticism of its disarmament record by pointing out that, since the end of the Cold War, it has eliminated more than 13,000 nuclear weapons, and eliminated more than 80% of its deployed strategic warheads and 90% of non-strategic warheads deployed to NATO, in the process eliminating whole categories of warheads and delivery systems and reducing its reliance on nuclear weapons. U.S. officials have also pointed out the ongoing U.S. work to dismantle nuclear warheads. By the time accelerated dismantlement efforts ordered by President George W. Bush were completed, the U.S. arsenal was less than a quarter of its size at the end of the Cold War, and smaller than it had been at any point since the Eisenhower administration, well before the drafting of the NPT.

The United States has also purchased many thousands of weapons' worth of uranium formerly in Soviet nuclear weapons for conversion into reactor fuel. As a consequence of this latter effort, it has been estimated that the equivalent of one lightbulb in every ten in the United States is powered by nuclear fuel removed from warheads previously targeted at the United States and its allies during the Cold War.

The U.S. Special Representative for Nuclear Nonproliferation agreed that nonproliferation and disarmament are linked, noting that they can be mutually reinforcing but also that growing proliferation risks create an environment that makes disarmament more difficult. The United Kingdom, France and Russia likewise defend their nuclear disarmament records, and the five NPT NWS issued a joint statement in 2008 reaffirming their Article VI disarmament commitments.

According to Thomas Reed and Danny Stillman, the "NPT has one giant loophole": Article IV gives each non-nuclear weapon state the "inalienable right" to pursue nuclear energy for the generation of power. A "number of high-ranking officials, even within the United Nations, have argued that they can do little to stop states using nuclear reactors to produce nuclear weapons". A 2009 United Nations report said that:

The revival of interest in nuclear power could result in the worldwide dissemination of uranium enrichment and spent fuel reprocessing technologies, which present obvious risks of proliferation as these technologies can produce fissile materials that are directly usable in nuclear weapons.

According to critics, those states which possess nuclear weapons, but are not authorized to do so under the NPT, have not paid a significant price for their pursuit of weapons capabilities. Also, the NPT has been explicitly weakened by a number of bilateral deals made by NPT signatories, notably the United States.

Based on concerns over the slow pace of nuclear disarmament and the continued reliance on nuclear weapons in military and security concepts, doctrines and policies, the Treaty on the Prohibition of Nuclear Weapons was adopted in July 2017 and was subsequently opened for signature on 20 September 2017. Entering into force on 22 January 2021, it prohibits each state party from the development, testing, production, stockpiling, stationing, transfer, use and threat of use of nuclear weapons, as well as assistance to those activities. It reaffirms in its preamble the vital role of the full and effective implementation of the NPT.

Ineffective enforcement of territorial integrity and rule of law in the 21st century could undermine the credibility of the security assurances that are part of the current global nuclear order.

== See also ==
- 13 steps (an important section in the Final Document of the 2000 Review Conference of the Treaty)
- Chemical Weapons Convention
- Comprehensive Nuclear-Test-Ban Treaty (CTBT)
- Humanitarian Initiative
- Global Initiative to Combat Nuclear Terrorism (GICNT)
- International Day for the Total Elimination of Nuclear Weapons
- Missile Technology Control Regime (MTCR)
- New Agenda Coalition (NAC)
- Non-Proliferation and Disarmament Initiative (NPDI)
- Nuclear armament
- Nuclear warfare
- Nuclear weapons convention
- Nuclear-weapon-free zone
  - Multi-country zones
    - African Nuclear-Weapon-Free Zone Treaty (Treaty of Pelindaba)
    - Central Asian Nuclear Weapon Free Zone (Treaty of Semei)
    - South Pacific Nuclear Free Zone Treaty (Treaty of Rarotonga)
    - Southeast Asian Nuclear-Weapon-Free Zone Treaty (Treaty of Bangkok)
    - Treaty for the Prohibition of Nuclear Weapons in Latin America and the Caribbean (Treaty of Tlatelolco)
  - Other UN-recognized zones
    - Mongolian Nuclear-Weapons-Free Zone
    - Outer Space Treaty
    - Seabed Arms Control Treaty
- Nuclear terrorism
- Partial Nuclear Test Ban Treaty (PTBT)
- Proliferation Security Initiative (PSI)
- Strategic Arms Limitation Talks (SALT)
- Strategic Offensive Reductions Treaty (SORT)
- Treaty on the Prohibition of Nuclear Weapons (also known as the Nuclear Weapon Ban Treaty)
- Weapon of Mass Destruction (WMD)
- Zangger Committee
- List of states with nuclear weapons
- List of weapons of mass destruction treaties
