= Non-Proliferation and Disarmament Initiative =

The Non-Proliferation and Disarmament Initiative (NPDI) is a coalition of states within the framework of the Nuclear Non-Proliferation Treaty (NPT) formed in 2010.

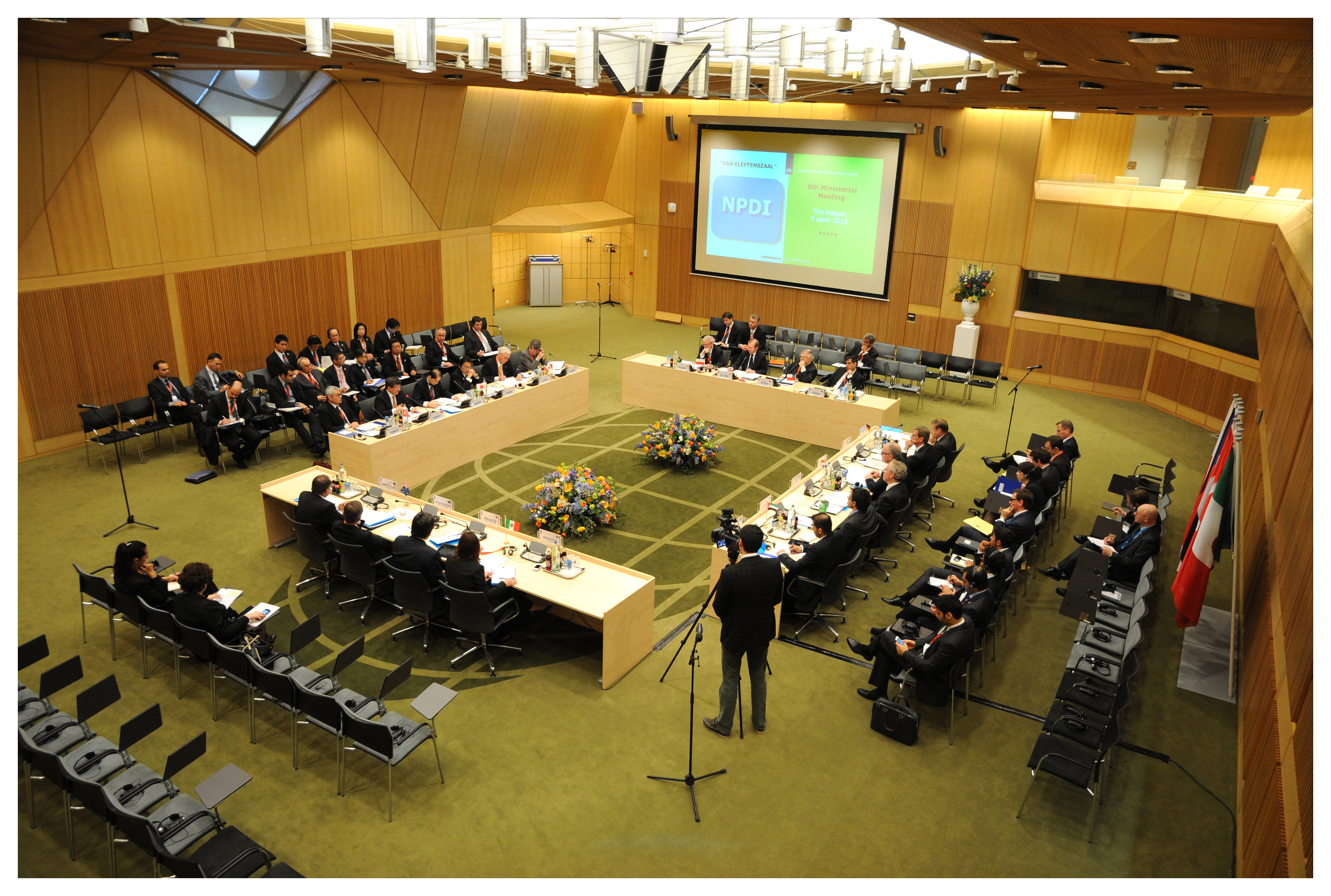
In the Hague in 2013

== History ==
The coalition was formed in an effort to help implement the Final Document of the 2010 NPT Review Conference, freshly adopted by consensus. It aims to:

- encouraging greater transparency surrounding nuclear disarmament efforts
- addressing the lack of substantive work in the Conference on Disarmament across the four core issue on its agenda
- increasing support for and conclusion of key legal instruments that safeguard and govern nuclear activities and strengthening the NPT regime

On April 12, 2014, the twelve member countries denounced North Korea's atomic program in the recent live-fire drills near the disputed border with South Korea. The coalition issued a statement condemning North Korea' nuclear and ballistic missile programmes and invited the said country to return to compliance with its IAEA safeguards agreement and the Nuclear Non-Proliferation Treaty (NPT).

=== Member countries ===
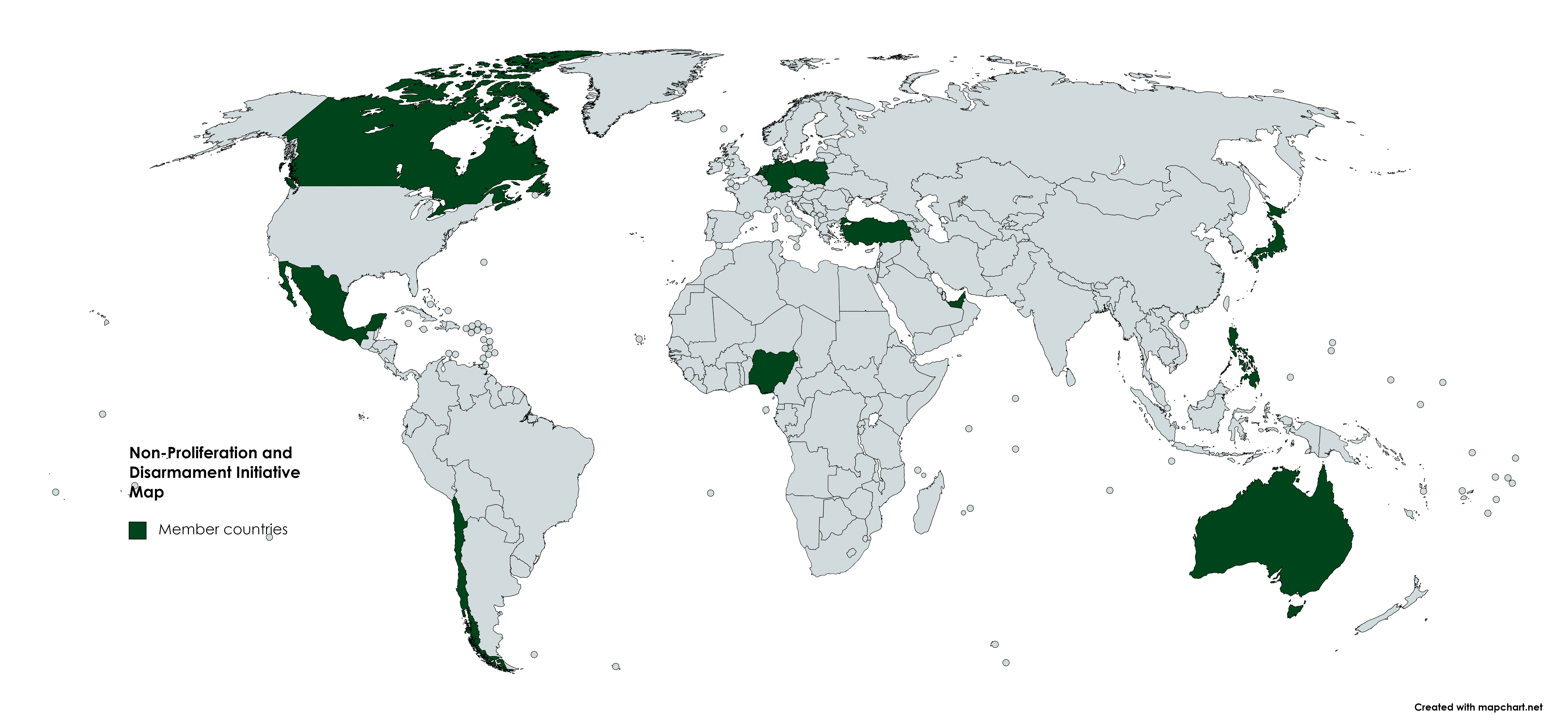
Non Proliferation and Disarmament Initiative Map

Composed of Australia, Canada, Chile, Germany, Japan, Mexico, Netherlands, Nigeria, the Philippines, Poland, Turkey and the United Arab Emirates, it has issued a series of declarations concerning the pace of NPT negotiations and the need to swiftly move on both non-proliferation and disarmament. Nigeria and the Philippines joined the Initiative in September 2013. Four members of the NPDI also joined the Humanitarian Initiative: Chile, Mexico, Nigeria and the Philippines.
