= Humanitarian Initiative =

The Humanitarian Initiative is a group of states that evolved within the framework of the Nuclear Non-Proliferation Treaty (NPT) and nuclear weapons diplomacy more widely. 159 states subscribed to the last iteration of the initiative's Joint Statement in 2015. Since 2013, it led to a series of conferences exploring the Humanitarian Impact of Nuclear Weapons, culminating in the Humanitarian Pledge, issued by the Austrian Government, to "fill the legal gap for the prohibition and elimination of nuclear weapons". The Pledge has been endorsed by 108 governments as of 1 June 2015. The Humanitarian Initiative is seen as a direct answer to the lack of progress in nuclear disarmament.

== Origins ==
The 2010 NPT Review Conference was formally successful, and concluded with 188 state parties adopting a consensus document, including language on the catastrophic humanitarian consequences any use of nuclear weapons would have:

The Conference expresses its deep concern at the catastrophic humanitarian consequences of any use of nuclear weapons and reaffirms the need for all States at all times to comply with applicable international law, including international humanitarian law.

This language was interpreted as a mandate to take forward the humanitarian perspective on nuclear weapons. At the next NPT conference, which was held in Vienna in 2012, Switzerland therefore delivered the "Joint Statement on the humanitarian dimension of nuclear disarmament" to the first session of the preparatory committee to the 2015 NPT Review Conference. The statement, delivered on 2 May 2012, was joined by 16 states. On 22 October of the same year, Benno Laggner, the Head of the Task Force on Nuclear Disarmament and Non-Proliferation of the Swiss Federal Department of Foreign Affairs, delivered a very similar version of the statement to the First Committee of the United Nations General Assembly in New York. This time, 35 nations had joined the Statement.

When South Africa on 24 April 2013 read the "Joint Statement on the humanitarian impact of nuclear weapons" to the second session of the preparatory committee to the 2015 NPT Review Conference, held in Geneva, the statement membership had swelled to 80 states, making it the largest mono-thematic statement in the history of the NPT. The meeting's Chair, Ambassador Cornel Feruta of Romania, dubbed the established group the "Humanitarian Initiative". Later in 2013, 125 states joined New Zealand's iteration of the same statement in the UN General Assembly, and 155 states at the UNGA First Committee on 20 October 2014. On 28 April 2015, 159 states formed part of the initiative, over 80 percent of the United Nations membership.

The statements of the Humanitarian Initiative are still drafted by the 16 original states and coordinated by the Swiss Department of Foreign Affairs. At the same time, a group of 16 other states - all of which rely on extended nuclear deterrence under the U.S. "nuclear umbrella" - read a competing statement on the humanitarian consequences. This statement was notable by the absence of the phrase, "It is in the interest of the very survival of humanity that nuclear weapons are never used again, under any circumstances." Especially this last phrase had been objected to by NATO states and other U.S. allies generally susceptible to arguments of international humanitarian law. The states explained that in order to keep nuclear deterrence, they needed to stand by a credible threat to use nuclear weapons under specific circumstances, and could therefore not endorse the statement of the original humanitarian initiative. However, 26 of these states joined a variant of the humanitarian statement, traditionally delivered by Australia, called the "Humanitarian Consequences Group".

== Humanitarian Impact of Nuclear Weapons conferences ==
=== Oslo conference ===
On 4 and 5 March 2013, the first-ever Conference on the Humanitarian Impact of Nuclear Weapons was hosted by NATO-member Norway, attended by 127 states. At the conference, scientists presented new findings on the impact of nuclear weapons on humans, cities, the environment and global climate. Humanitarian organisations including UNDP, OCHA and the ICRC explained that in the event of a nuclear detonation, no organisation in the world would be able to provide adequate help, nor was it likely that an adequate capacity could be built. The conference greatly contributed to the momentum around the discussion on the humanitarian consequences of nuclear weapons, with Mexico announcing a follow-up conference.

=== Nayarit conference ===
The second conference was held in Nayarit, Mexico, on 13–14 February 2014 and drew 146 states, international and humanitarian organisations as well as civil society coordinated by the International Campaign to Abolish Nuclear Weapons. In addition to the topics of the Oslo meeting, the conference also discussed the risk of accidental detonations, or the use of nuclear weapons by miscalculation. In the Chair's summary of the meeting, the Mexican Government noted that:

The effects of a nuclear weapon detonation are not constrained by national borders − it is therefore an issue of deep concern shared by all. (...) Today the risk of nuclear weapons use is growing globally as a consequence of proliferation, the vulnerability of nuclear command and control networks to cyber-attacks and to human error, and potential access to nuclear weapons by non-state actors, in particular terrorist groups. As more countries deploy more nuclear weapons on higher levels of combat readiness, the risks of accidental, mistaken, unauthorized or intentional use of these weapons grow significantly. (...) It is a fact that no State or international organization has the capacity to address or provide the short and long term humanitarian assistance and protection needed in case of a nuclear weapon explosion. Moreover, it would not be possible to establish such capacities, even if attempted. (...)

We need to take into account that, in the past, weapons have been eliminated after they have been outlawed. We believe this is the path to achieve a world without nuclear weapons. In our view, this is consistent with our obligations under international law, including those derived from the NPT as well as from Common Article 1 to the Geneva Conventions. (...) The broad-based and comprehensive discussions on the humanitarian impact of nuclear weapons should lead to the commitment of States and civil society to reach new international standards and norms, through a legally binding instrument. It is the view of the Chair that the Nayarit Conference has shown that time has come to initiate a diplomatic process conducive to this goal (...) making the humanitarian impact of nuclear weapons the essence of disarmament efforts.

It is time to take action. The 70th anniversary of the Hiroshima and Nagasaki attacks is the appropriate milestone to achieve our goal. Nayarit is a point of no return.

=== Vienna conference ===
The Vienna Conference on the Humanitarian Impact of Nuclear Weapons was hosted by the Austrian Government on 8–9 December 2014. For the first time, Western states armed with nuclear weapons also attended the conference, with representatives from the United States and the United Kingdom. The French government declined to attend, while India and Pakistan had already attended the prior meetings. China sent a high-ranking diplomat, but only in observer capacity (i.e. accredited as 'academic'). In addition to a reiteration of the evidence on the humanitarian impact of nuclear detonations and nuclear testing, and scientific analysis of the risk of such detonations occurring, the Vienna Conference also included a panel on the contributions of international humanitarian law, international environmental law, to the legal status of nuclear weapons.

Pope Francis also sent a personal message to the conference, calling for nuclear disarmament. The Vatican used this opportunity to rebalance its position on nuclear weapons, judging that nuclear deterrence "can no longer be deemed a policy that stands firmly on moral ground."

=== Outlook ===
The series of conferences, renewed attention for the humanitarian impact of nuclear weapons and the Austrian Pledge have all increased expectations for the 2015 NPT Review Conference. It is rumoured that a follow-up conference to the Vienna Conference could be hosted by South Africa or Brazil. In the summary of the Mexican conference, Juan Manuel Gomez-Robledo, Mexico's deputy Foreign Minister had called for negotiations on a new legal instrument for the prohibition of nuclear weapons to commence around the 70th anniversary of the nuclear bombings of Hiroshima and Nagasaki, i.e. in August 2015.

== The Humanitarian Pledge ==
At the close of the Vienna conference on the Humanitarian Impact of Nuclear Weapons, and alongside the Chair's summary, the Austrian Government issued the Austrian Pledge in its national capacity, in which recalled the "legal gap for the prohibition and elimination of nuclear weapons". Austria therefore "pledges to cooperate with all relevant stakeholders, States, international organisations, the International Red Cross and Red Crescent Movements, parliamentarians and civil society, in efforts to stigmatise, prohibit and eliminate nuclear weapons in light of their unacceptable humanitarian consequences and associated risks." The Austrian Pledge was a major development in the run up to the 2015 Review Conference of the Nuclear Non-Proliferation Treaty, which reviews the implementation of the treaty in a five-yearly cycle. Before the conference, 66 states had endorsed the Pledge. During the conference, the perceived intransigence of nuclear weapon states and uncertain prospects for a consensus outcome pushed a growing number of states to endorse the Pledge. Austria reacted by "internationalising" the Pledge, renaming it Humanitarian Pledge. By the end of the conference, 107 states had endorsed it, which was hailed by civil society as "the real outcome" of the NPT review. The Humanitarian Pledge has been endorsed by 108 states as of 1 June 2015.

== The humanitarian dimension of nuclear disarmament ==
The Humanitarian Initiative carries forward the focus on the humanitarian dimension of nuclear disarmament, which focuses on the humanitarian impact of nuclear weapons rather than on the security dimension that a minority of states attributes to them. Since all states have to abide by international humanitarian law at all times, it is questionable whether nuclear weapons can ever be used lawfully, in view of their indiscriminate and disproportionate effects, and the need to refrain from attacks that do not fit these requirements, in line with the principle of precaution. In 1996, the International Court of Justice stated in its advisory opinion on nuclear weapons that "it is difficult to envisage how any use of nuclear weapons could be compatible with the requirements of international humanitarian law," but declined to issue an opinion on the "policy of deterrence" or to conclude that "recourse to nuclear weapons would be illegal in any circumstance." In light of the evidence gathered by the three conferences on the Humanitarian Impact of Nuclear Weapons, the ICRC has strengthened its position, calling the prohibition and elimination of nuclear weapons a "humanitarian imperative".

Author Eric Schlosser, in his 2013 book "Command and Control," described accidents involving nuclear weapons and argued that the number and severity was greater than officially acknowledged. A document obtained via a Freedom of Information Act request contained information on over one thousand accidents involving nuclear weapons in the United States, between 1950 and 1968, although many of them were "trivial."

== Controversy ==
The statement has generated controversy in states under the US nuclear umbrella but especially critical of nuclear weapons. The German foreign minister announced Germany would seek out ways to join the statement at a future iteration.

In Japan, much attention was given to the Nagasaki Mayor Tomihisa Taue, who among others attacked the government for failing to join the Humanitarian Initiative. Japan's Foreign Minister Fumio Kishida subsequently stated it was "quite regrettable" his country had not joined the statement. Kishida later announced Japan's decision to sign the next iteration of the statement, after public pressure by NGOs and the mayor of Nagasaki increased. Four members of NATO as well as five members of the Non-Proliferation and Disarmament Initiative have thus far joined the initiative.

Japan has come under similar pressure for announce that it will not endorse the Austrian Pledge. Similarly, NATO-states have come under increasing pressure to justify their reluctance to engage with the arguments of the humanitarian initiative.

Former Australian Foreign Minister Gareth Evans also criticized the Australian government sharply for staying away from the statement, after documents obtained by the International Campaign to Abolish Nuclear Weapons under the Freedom of Information Act showed Australian opposition to efforts towards nuclear disarmament. The Australian government drew heavy criticism for its diplomatic attempts to undermine the New Zealand-led humanitarian initiative statements, and the possibility of a treaty banning nuclear weapons in the near term.

== Members of the Initiative ==
Austrian Minister of Foreign Affairs Sebastian Kurz delivered the statement of the Humanitarian Initiative at the 2015 Review Conference on the nuclear Non-Proliferation Treaty, on 28 April 2015, speaking on behalf of 159 states. This has been described as "the biggest cross-regional joint declaration ever on a substantive issue in the UN context". The following 159 states have signed on to the statement: Afghanistan, Algeria, Andorra, Angola, Antigua and Barbuda, Argentina, Armenia, Austria, Azerbaijan, Bahamas, Bahrain, Bangladesh, Barbados, Belarus, Belize, Benin, Bolivia, Bosnia and Herzegovina, Botswana, Brazil, Brunei Darussalam, Burkina Faso, Burundi, Cabo Verde, Cambodia, Cameroon, Central African Republic, Chad, Chile, Colombia, Comoros, Congo, Cook Islands, Costa Rica, Côte d'Ivoire, Cuba, Cyprus, DR Congo, Denmark, Djibouti, Dominica, Dominican Republic, Ecuador, Egypt, El Salvador, Equatorial Guinea, Eritrea, Ethiopia, Fiji, Finland, Gabon, Gambia, Georgia, Ghana, Grenada, Guatemala, Guinea, Guinea Bissau, Guyana, Haiti, Holy See, Honduras, Iceland, Indonesia, Iran, Iraq, Ireland, Jamaica, Japan, Jordan, Kazakhstan, Kenya, Kiribati, Kuwait, Kyrgyzstan, Lao PDR, Lebanon, Lesotho, Liberia, Libya, Liechtenstein, Macedonia, Madagascar, Malawi, Malaysia, Maldives, Mali, Malta, Marshall Islands, Mauritania, Mauritius, Mexico, Federated States of Micronesia, Republic of Moldova, Mongolia, Montenegro, Morocco, Mozambique, Myanmar, Namibia, Nauru, Nepal, New Zealand, Nicaragua, Niger, Nigeria, Niue, Norway, Oman, Palau, State of Palestine, Panama, Papua New Guinea, Paraguay, Peru, Philippines, Qatar, Rwanda, Saint Kitts and Nevis, Saint Lucia, Saint Vincent and the Grenadines, Samoa, San Marino, São Tomé and Príncipe, Saudi Arabia, Senegal, Serbia, Seychelles, Sierra Leone, Singapore, Solomon Islands, Somalia, South Africa, South Sudan, Sri Lanka, Sudan, Suriname, Swaziland, Sweden, Switzerland, Tajikistan, Tanzania, Thailand, Timor-Leste, Togo, Tonga, Trinidad and Tobago, Tunisia, Tuvalu, Uganda, Ukraine, United Arab Emirates, Uruguay, Vanuatu, Venezuela, Vietnam, Yemen, Zambia, and Zimbabwe.

== See also ==
- International Humanitarian Law
- Weapons of Mass Destruction
- Nuclear disarmament
- New Agenda Coalition
- Non-Aligned Movement
- Non-Proliferation and Disarmament Initiative
- Treaty on the Prohibition of Nuclear Weapons
