= 2010 NPT Review Conference =

International conference at UN Headquarters, New York

The 2010 Review Conference for the Treaty on the Non-Proliferation of Nuclear Weapons (NPT) was held at United Nations Headquarters in New York City from 3 to 28 May 2010. The President of the Review Conference is Ambassador Libran N. Cabactulan of the Philippines. UN Secretary-General Ban Ki-moon used the opening of the conference to note that "sixty five years later, the world still lives under the nuclear shadow".

The Review Conference considered a number of issues, including: universality of the Treaty; nuclear disarmament, including specific practical measures; nuclear non-proliferation, including the promoting and strengthening of safeguards; measures to advance the peaceful use of nuclear energy, safety and security; regional disarmament and non-proliferation; implementation of the 1995 resolution on the Middle East; measures to address withdrawal from the Treaty; measures to further strengthen the review process; and ways to promote engagement with civil society in strengthening NPT norms and in promoting disarmament education.

== Background ==
The Nuclear Nonproliferation Treaty (NPT), which entered into force in 1970, recognizes five countries as nuclear-weapon states (the United States, Russia, the United Kingdom, France, and China), who commit to pursue disarmament, and the right of other signatories to use nuclear technology for peaceful purposes, conditional upon their non-acquisition of nuclear weapons. Its ratification is nearly universal because it is adhered by 189 states, including five nuclear-weapon states, with the exception of Israel, India, and Pakistan. North Korea tested its first nuclear weapon in 2006 after announcing its withdrawal from the NPT in 2003.

Conferences to review the operation of the Treaty have been held at five-year intervals since the Treaty went into effect in 1970. Each conference has sought to find agreement on a final declaration that would assess the implementation of the Treaty's provisions and make recommendations on measures to further strengthen it. The treaty's last Review Conference in 2005, ended without a consensus document primarily because of disputes related to the nuclear program of Iran and Egypt's focus on Israel's nuclear program and implementation of the 1995 NPT resolution calling for a Middle East zone free of all weapons of mass destruction. However, with the impact of the review in 2005, Montenegro has successfully joined the treaty in 2006.

== The NPT Review Process ==
NPT Review Conferences have been held every five years, beginning in 1975, and most recently in 2015.

- The 1995 NPT Review and Extension Conference. There were 2 objectives; (1) to review the Treaty's operation and (2) to decide on its extension. Although the review did not reach a consensus review of the Treaty's implementation, states parties adopted without a vote a package of three decisions and a resolution. The decisions consisted of (1) elements for a strengthened review process for the Treaty, (2) principles and objectives for nuclear non-proliferation and disarmament, and (3) the indefinite extension of the Treaty. The resolution dealt with the Middle East.
- The 2000 Review Conference. States parties successfully concluded their agreement on a Final Document that assessed past performance of the treaty and on a number of key issues relating to nuclear non-proliferation and disarmament, nuclear safety and the peaceful uses of nuclear energy.
- The 2005 and 2015 Review Conferences. States parties failed to reach agreement on any final document.

== Context ==
Three major events occurred prior to the 2010 NPT Review Conference:

- The New START treaty was signed on 8 April 2010 in Prague by U.S. President Barack Obama and Russian President Dmitry Medvedev.
- The 2010 Nuclear Security Summit was held on 12–13 April 2010 in Washington, D.C.
- Iran held a conference on disarmament and non-proliferation on 17–18 April 2010 in Tehran.

Participants

President Ahmadinejad of Iran was the only head of government participating in the Review Conference. In addition to Secretary Clinton, Foreign Ministers of Austria, Indonesia, and several other countries, as well as Baroness Ashton, High Representative for Foreign Affairs and Security Policy of the European Union.

== Discussions ==
On 3 May, the conference began with speeches by UN Secretary-General Ban Ki-moon and IAEA Director General Yukiya Amano, both of whom called for promoting the use of nuclear energy for peaceful purposes and technical cooperation, and for greater cooperation on issues of nonproliferation and disarmament.

UN Secretary-General Ban Ki-moon opened his speech by discussing the U.S. atomic bombing of Hiroshima, and noted that "sixty five years later, the world still lives under the nuclear shadow". Ban-Ki Moon called for additional steps to be taken by nuclear weapon states towards nuclear disarmament, including steps for the universality of the NPT, a "framework of legal instruments that complement the NPT", and "progress towards a nuclear-weapon-free-zone in the Middle East and on other regional concerns".

Amano noted that "it is expected that between 10 and 25 new countries will bring their first nuclear power plants online by 2030" since it is for each sovereign State to decide whether or not to use nuclear power, and said that "more efforts are needed to achieve sufficient, assured and predictable funding of technical cooperation". Amano also said that "IAEA safeguards are a fundamental pillar of the nuclear non-proliferation regime" and that the Agency was working to "resolve important safeguards implementation issues in three states". Amano said the IAEA General Conference had adopted resolutions in recent years on the establishment of a nuclear-weapon-free zone in the Middle East and Israeli nuclear capabilities, and that he would take these issues up as well.

=== Statements by countries ===
Indonesia Indonesia's Foreign Minister, R. M. Marty N. Natalegawa spoke on behalf of Non-Aligned Movement (NAM). "While there are some positive signs in the field of nuclear disarmament, much more needs to be done to achieve complete nuclear disarmament," he said. NAM recognized the new Strategic Arms Reduction Treaty, but said it remained "below the international community's expectations which anticipate more concrete uniform and systematic nuclear disarmament". NAM further noted that modernization of nuclear weapons arsenals constituted "non-compliance by the Nuclear Weapons States with their obligations under Article VI of the Treaty". NAM also called for the freezing of cooperation with states which were working outside of the treaty, and for the establishment of a nuclear-weapon free zone in the Middle East.

Iran President Ahmadinejad of Iran, criticized and charged Washington with leading a skewed international system that seeks to deny peaceful nuclear power to developing nations while allowing allies such as Israel to stockpile atomic arms and put forward a proposal for nuclear disarmament. Ahmadinejad called for guarantees against the use of nuclear weapons, a halt to research of nuclear weapons, a halt to cooperation with states operating outside of the treaty, the establishment of a nuclear free zone in the Middle East, the dismantling of nuclear weapons in Europe, and a legally binding framework for nuclear disarmament.

United States U.S. Secretary of State Hillary Clinton delivered a statement that called for NPT Parties to "focus on promoting practical solutions, not pursuing unrealistic agendas, adding that "Now is the time to build consensus, not to block it." She accused Iran of "whatever it can to divert attention away from its own record and to attempt to evade accountability," and said Iran "has defied the UN Security Council and the IAEA, and placed the future of the nonproliferation regime in jeopardy." Clinton also touted the U.S. record on nuclear disarmament, citing the Nuclear Posture Review, the New START Treaty and reductions in the U.S. nuclear weapon stockpile. She announced that the Obama Administration would seek Senate approval of the Protocols to the nuclear-weapon-free zones in Africa and the South Pacific, and announced a U.S. pledge of $50 million to launch an IAEA Peaceful Uses Initiative.

Japan State Secretary for Foreign Affairs of Japan Tetsure Fukuyama said "the citizens of both Hiroshima and Nagasaki are watching with very keen eyes what will come out of this Conference. It was as few as two atomic bombs that claimed the lives of more than 200 thousand civilians, and left many to suffer from the after-effects of radiation even today 60 years later." Fukuyama also said "that all Parties to the Treaty must work to bridge the differences in their respective positions and find common ground for collaboration in the spirit of multilateralism, in order to pave the way for a "world without nuclear weapons" while also maintaining "atoms for peace."

== Events ==
- On 3 May 2010, the U.S. Defense Department released aggregate stockpile numbers for 1962–2009 which brought up to date a 1994 release by the U.S. Department of Energy. The release led the Federation of American Scientists to estimate the United States as having 9,613 total assembled nuclear warheads.
- On 4 May 2010 Iranian President, Mahmoud Ahmadinejad, announced Iran's agreement in principle to Brazilian mediation to revive a U.N.-brokered nuclear fuel swap deal with world powers. On 17 May, the Foreign Ministers of Brazil, Turkey issued a statement agreeing to exchange its enriched uranium for fuel for the Tehran Research Reactor (see Nuclear program of Iran#Tehran Nuclear Declaration, 2010). Soon afterwards, the UN Security Council imposed a fourth round of sanctions on Iran over its nuclear program (see United Nations Security Council Resolution 1929).

== Outcome ==
The Conference closed on 28 May and until the last minute was hard to know if it would have a positive outcome, as the risk of blocking persisted. Consensus was achieved during the afternoon that day, when the plenary was finally gathered and Ambassador Cabactulan got the approval for his proposal of Final Document.

The final document supported the early entry into force of the Comprehensive Nuclear-Test-Ban Treaty, as well as the prompt negotiation of a Fissile Material Cut-off Treaty, recognized the legitimate interest of non-nuclear weapon states to request nuclear weapon states to reduce operational status of their nuclear weapons. It also called to achieve total disarmament and then to maintain a world without nuclear weapons.

The final document called for a 2012 conference of all Middle Eastern states to move forward on a 1995 proposal for a nuclear-free Mideast and for the United Nations secretary general, along with the United States, Russia and Britain, to appoint a facilitator and consult with the countries of the Middle East convening the conference. The United States announced after the Review Conference that the United States, Russia, and the United Kingdom, along with the UN Secretary General, will co-sponsor the meeting and determine a country to host it and an individual to help organize it. The document also called for India, Pakistan and Israel, all holding nuclear weapons but not nonproliferation treaty members, to join the Nuclear Non Proliferation Treaty (NPT). It also emphasized the need for countries to respect treaty guidelines for keeping their nuclear programs open to international inspection and suffering the consequences if they do not. With respect to international inspection the document called for the universal adoption of the IAEA Additional Protocol.

The document contained a recommitment of nations to the basic bargain of the NPT i.e. that "Countries with nuclear weapons will move towards disarmament, countries without nuclear weapons will not acquire them, and all countries can access peaceful nuclear energy." It also contained specific action plans on nonproliferation, disarmament, and peaceful uses of nuclear energy. There are specific and measurable actions in the final document that states are asked to take in support of these three pillars of the NPT, which could serve as a scorecard for measuring progress and ensuring there would be accountability at future meetings.

The nonproliferation section covered a range of issues such as: ensuring compliance, strengthening safeguards, encouraging the adoption of the Additional Protocol, supporting the IAEA, strengthening export controls, emphasizing the need for the physical protection of nuclear materials, stopping illicit trafficking, and preventing nuclear terrorism, etc. The nonproliferation action plan also enabled a scorecard exercise to see how well states perform on the stated actions.

In the disarmament section, for the first time, a world free of nuclear weapons was articulated as the goal of nuclear disarmament. Acknowledged nuclear weapon states also committed themselves to continuing to work together to accelerate concrete progress on disarmament. Efforts to include a timeline for a negotiated nuclear weapons convention failed, but the disarmament action plan included a timeline whereby the nuclear weapon states should report on their disarmament activities at the 2014 NPT Preparatory Committee meeting. They were also encouraged to develop a standard reporting form as a confidence building measure.

The outcome document also reiterates that all states have to abide by international humanitarian law at all times, while expressing concern at the "catastrophic humanitarian consequences" any nuclear weapon detonation would entail. This language gave rise, in subsequent conferences of the NPT, to the Humanitarian Initiative, which is further pushing the envelope on the delegitimization of nuclear weapons in light of their humanitarian consequences. Norway and Mexico are also fulfilling this mandate for a renewed focus on the humanitarian consequences through their hosting of conferences focusing specifically on the Humanitarian Impact of Nuclear Weapons, in early 2013 and early 2014, respectively.

== See also ==
- Nuclear Non-Proliferation Treaty
- Barack Obama speech in Prague, 2009
- Nuclear disarmament
- Nuclear proliferation
- Anti-nuclear movement
