= International Day for the Total Elimination of Nuclear Weapons =

United Nations observance on 26 September

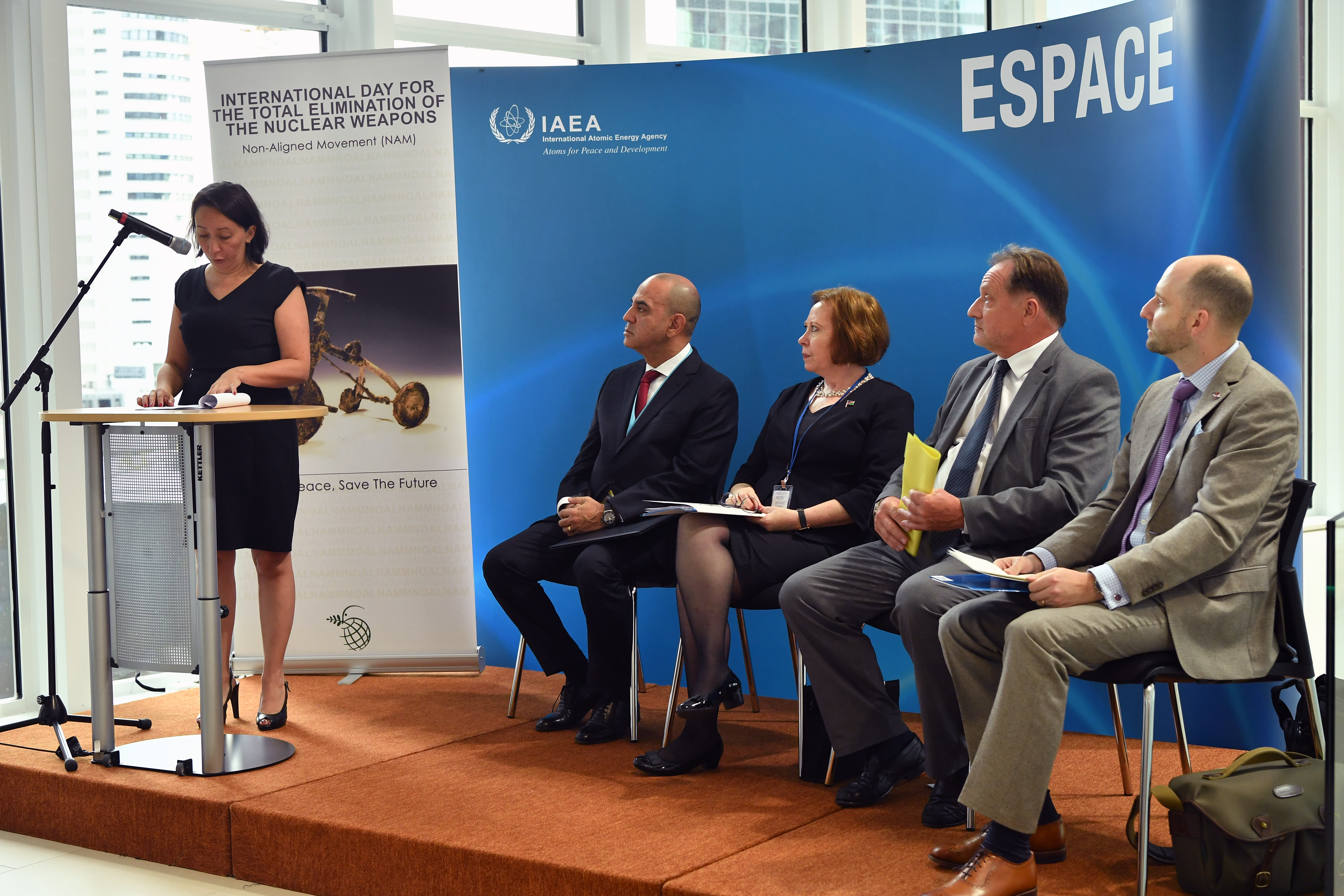
- The Non-Aligned Movement event marking Nuclear Weapons Elimination Day at the 2019 IAEA conference
- Type: International
- Significance: Advocacy for nuclear disarmament
- Date: 26 September
- Next time: 26 September 2026
- First time: 2014; 12 years ago

The International Day for the Total Elimination of Nuclear Weapons, also known as Nuclear Weapons Elimination Day, is an international observance declared by the United Nations, held on 26 September every year. The day promotes the cause of nuclear disarmament. The observance was established in 2013.

== History ==
On 26 September 2013, the UN General Assembly held its first ever high-level meeting on nuclear disarmament; the resolution that convened the meeting stated that the UN was "Convinced that nuclear disarmament and the complete elimination of nuclear weapons are essential to remove the danger of nuclear war." On 3 December, the General Assembly passed resolution 68/32, affirming that the high-level meeting had endorsed the abolition of nuclear weapons, and declaring an annual International Day for the Total Elimination of Nuclear Weapons on the anniversary of the meeting. 26 September also corresponds with the anniversary of the 1983 Soviet nuclear false alarm incident, in which errors in a Soviet early warning system generated false reports of incoming ICBMs. However, the resolution declaring the observance did not make explicit reference to this co-occurrence.

In March 2014, the Inter-Parliamentary Union passed a resolution calling on parliamentarians to "promote and commemorate" Nuclear Weapon Elimination Day and to work towards the abolition of nuclear weapons worldwide. The first observance took place in September 2014. In May 2018, following up on the 2013 high-level meeting and in accordance with resolution 68/32, the UN held the High-Level Conference on Nuclear Disarmament. NGOs and academics, as well as politicians from member states, were invited to participate. For the 2019 Nuclear Weapons Elimination Day, a ceremony was held at UN Headquarters in which 12 states signed and 5 ratified the Treaty on the Prohibition of Nuclear Weapons, which had been finalised in 2017. The treaty came into force in 2021.

On the 2023 Day, UN Secretary General António Guterres said that "geopolitical mistrust and competition" had raised the risk of nuclear conflict back to Cold War levels. He again reaffirmed the UN's "commitment to a world free of nuclear weapons". In the UK, a group of activists from the Campaign for Nuclear Disarmament were denied access to the US Air Force-operated base RAF Lakenheath, where they planned to carry out an "inspection". No US nuclear weapons were based in the UK as of 2023, but there was speculation at the time that they could at some point be returned to Lakenheath, where they had been stationed from 1954 to 2007. In Japan, a group of NGOs and the UN Information Office held a symposium on nuclear disarmament, joined by officials from the Foreign Ministry.

== See also ==
- International Day of Peace
- Nuclear weapons convention
- United Nations observances
- United Nations Office for Disarmament Affairs
