= Nuclear weapons convention =

Proposed multilateral treaty

A nuclear weapons convention is a proposed multilateral treaty to eliminate nuclear weapons. This might include prohibitions on the possession, development, testing, production, stockpiling, transfer, use and threat of use of nuclear weapons, such as those in the Treaty on the Prohibition of Nuclear Weapons, along with provisions for their verified elimination. It could be similar to existing conventions outlawing other categories of weapons, such as biological weapons, chemical weapons, anti-personnel mines and cluster bombs.

== History ==
The Nuclear Non-Proliferation Treaty states that "Each of the Parties to the Treaty undertakes to pursue negotiations in good faith on effective measures relating to cessation of the nuclear arms race at an early date and to nuclear disarmament, and on a treaty on general and complete disarmament." In 1996, the International Court of Justice concluded that this means "There exists an obligation to pursue in good faith and bring to a conclusion negotiations leading to nuclear disarmament in all its aspects under strict and effective international control."

Each year since 1996, the UN General Assembly has passed a resolution calling on all countries immediately to fulfill their disarmament obligation, as articulated by the International Court of Justice, "by commencing multilateral negotiations leading to an early conclusion of a nuclear weapons convention." In 2007, 127 countries voted in favour of the resolution, including four countries with nuclear weapons: China, India, Pakistan and North Korea.

In 1997, a consortium of experts in law, science, disarmament and negotiation drafted a model nuclear weapons convention, which Costa Rica submitted to the UN Secretary-General as a discussion draft. The International Campaign to Abolish Nuclear Weapons launched an updated version of the model convention in 2007 at a meeting of parties to the Treaty on the Non-Proliferation of Nuclear Weapons, and Costa Rica submitted this as a Conference Document.

On 24 October 2008 the UN Secretary-General Ban Ki-moon discussed a nuclear weapons convention in an address to the East-West Institute entitled "The United Nations and security in a nuclear-weapon-free world." In his five-point program he proposed two alternatives for nuclear disarmament negotiations, either "a framework of separate, mutually reinforcing instruments," or "a nuclear-weapons convention, backed by a strong system of verification," citing the Costa Rican proposal as a good point of departure on the second option.

In the 2020s, the international framework for nuclear arms control experienced a period of rapid disintegration, marking a transition to what some analysts called a "Third Nuclear Age." This period was characterized by the functional collapse of landmark treaties, notably the 2026 expiration of New START, which Russia had suspended in 2023 over U.S. opposition to the 2022 Russian invasion of Ukraine. During this phase, the focus shifted from disarmament toward active rearmament, including the rapid expansion of China's rapid expansion of its nuclear arsenal, Russia's nuclear diversification, and strategic modernization by other nuclear powers. This era also increasing use of nuclear deterrent rhetoric in regional conflicts, particularly in Ukraine.

=== Mechanisms proposed in the 2007 model convention ===
The model convention text requires countries with nuclear weapons to destroy them in stages, including taking them off high alert status, removing them from deployment, removing the warheads from their delivery vehicles, disabling the warheads by removing the explosive "pits", and placing the fissile material under UN control. As well as outlawing nuclear weapons, this convention would prohibit the production of fissile materials suitable for making them, namely highly enriched uranium and separated plutonium.

It would establish an agency to ensure that countries comply with the terms of the treaty. This body would receive progress reports from nuclear-armed states, conduct inspections of weapons facilities, acquire intelligence through satellite photography and remote sensors, and monitor the production and transfer of materials suitable for making nuclear weapons.

== Support ==
A 2008 poll put global public support for a NWC at 76%, with 16% against.

In 2011, the Council of Delegates of the International Red Cross and Red Crescent Movement appealed to all states "to pursue in good faith and conclude with urgency and determination negotiations to prohibit the use of and completely eliminate nuclear weapons through a legally binding international agreement, based on existing commitments and international obligations".

== Opposition ==
France, Russia, the UK and the US oppose a NWC.

== See also ==
- Arms control
- International Day for the Total Elimination of Nuclear Weapons
- Nuclear-weapon-free zone
- Treaty on the Prohibition of Nuclear Weapons
