= New Agenda Coalition =

The New Agenda Coalition (NAC), composed of Brazil, Egypt, Ireland, Mexico, New Zealand and South Africa, is a geographically dispersed group of middle power countries seeking to build an international consensus to make progress on nuclear disarmament, as legally called for in the Nuclear Non-Proliferation Treaty (NPT).

== Founding ==
The group was formed in response to the North–South divide that stymied talks on nuclear disarmament and non-proliferation within the framework of the NPT. Non-nuclear weapon states believed not enough progress was being made on disarmament to have warranted the indefinite extension of the treaty in 1995, and that nuclear weapons states were not fulfilling their legal responsibilities towards disarmament, as outlined by Article VI of the NPT.

The NAC was officially launched in Dublin in June 1998, with a Joint Declaration by the Ministers for Foreign Affairs of Brazil, Egypt, Ireland, Mexico, New Zealand, South Africa, Sweden, and Slovenia, the latter two of which subsequently left the Coalition.

On June 9, 1998, an 18-point declaration entitled "A Nuclear-Weapons-Free World: The Need for a New Agenda" was signed by the governments of the eight nations of Brazil, Egypt, Ireland, Mexico, New Zealand, Slovenia, South Africa, and Sweden to shape foreign policy around the goal of "the elimination of nuclear weapons and assurance that they will never be produced again." Of particular concern to the signatories are the states who have refused to sign the Nuclear Non-Proliferation Treaty. The Nuclear Free World Policy is considered by many to be a "fundamental and requisite step" following from the treaty. New Zealand's stand on nuclear issues was a step on the way towards the Nuclear Free World Policy.

The declaration begins:

1. We, the Ministers for Foreign Affairs of Brazil, Egypt, Ireland, Mexico, New Zealand, Slovenia, South Africa and Sweden have considered the continued threat to humanity represented by the perspective of the indefinite possession of nuclear weapons by the nuclear-weapon states as well as by those three nuclear-weapons-capable states that have not acceded to the Non-Proliferation Treaty, and the attendant possibility of use or threat of use of nuclear weapons. The seriousness of this predicament has been further underscored by the recent nuclear tests conducted by India and Pakistan.

== Members ==
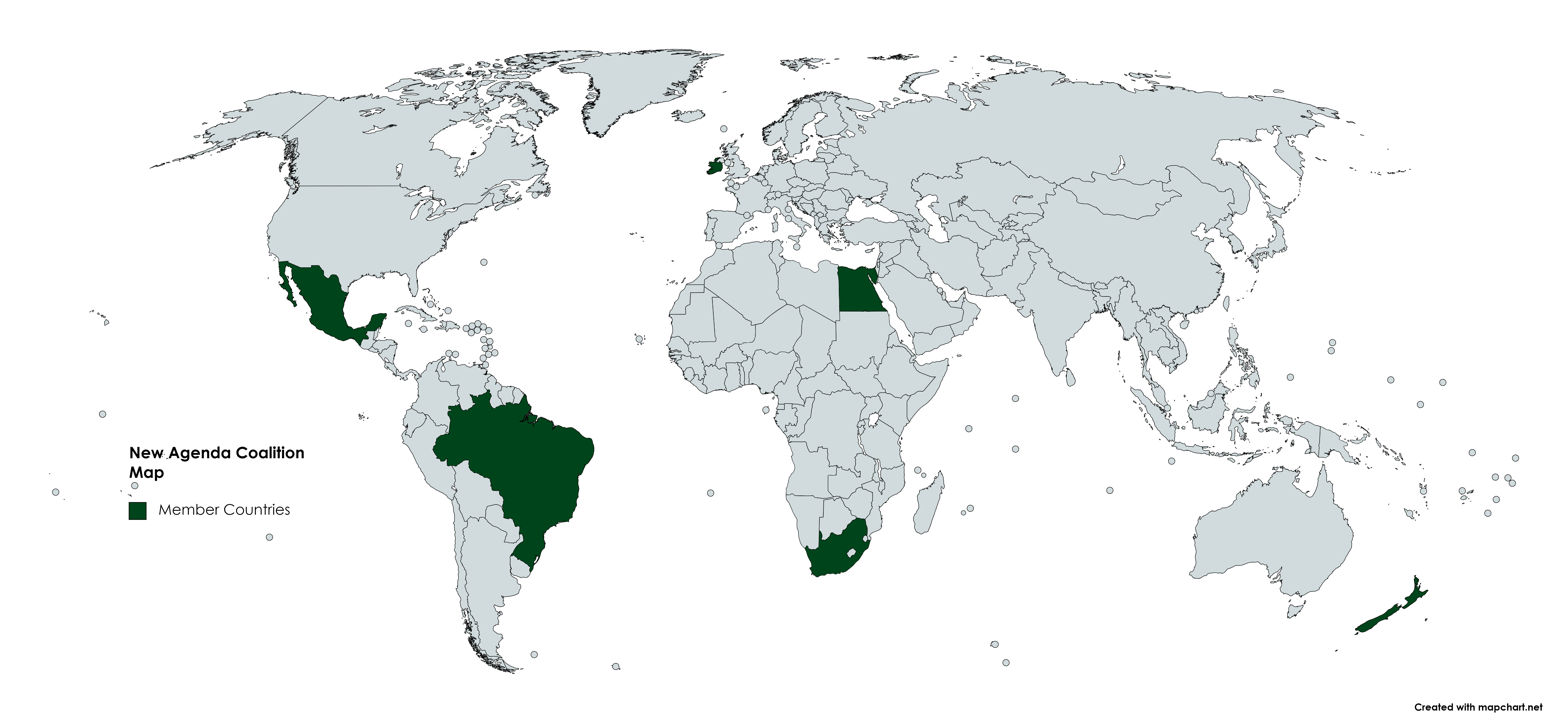
New Agenda Coalition Map

- Brazil
- Egypt
- Ireland
- Mexico
- New Zealand
- South Africa

== History ==
In 2000, the New Agenda Coalition was instrumental in crafting a breakthrough in the NPT Review Conference. While prospects at the outset of the conference initially seemed bleak, the New Agenda Coalition put together a historic agreement outlined in the 13 Steps, in which the nuclear weapons states affirmed, in accordance with Article VI of the NPT, that nuclear disarmament can and should proceed independently of general disarmament, that the nuclear powers have a responsibility to work together on "an unequivocal undertaking" to eliminate their arsenals, and that 13 relatively simple steps could help rid the world of nuclear weapons quickly, verifiably, and irreversibly.

Since the 2000 Review conference, the New Agenda Coalition has submitted annual resolutions to the UN First Committee on Disarmament and International Security. Each of the Coalition's resolutions has been approved by the committee with overwhelming support. They also continue to advance position papers at the NPT review meetings and their preparatory meetings.

All current members of the New Agenda Coalition have joined the Humanitarian Initiative, which was founded in 2013 also in the context of the NPT.
