= Fri (yacht) =

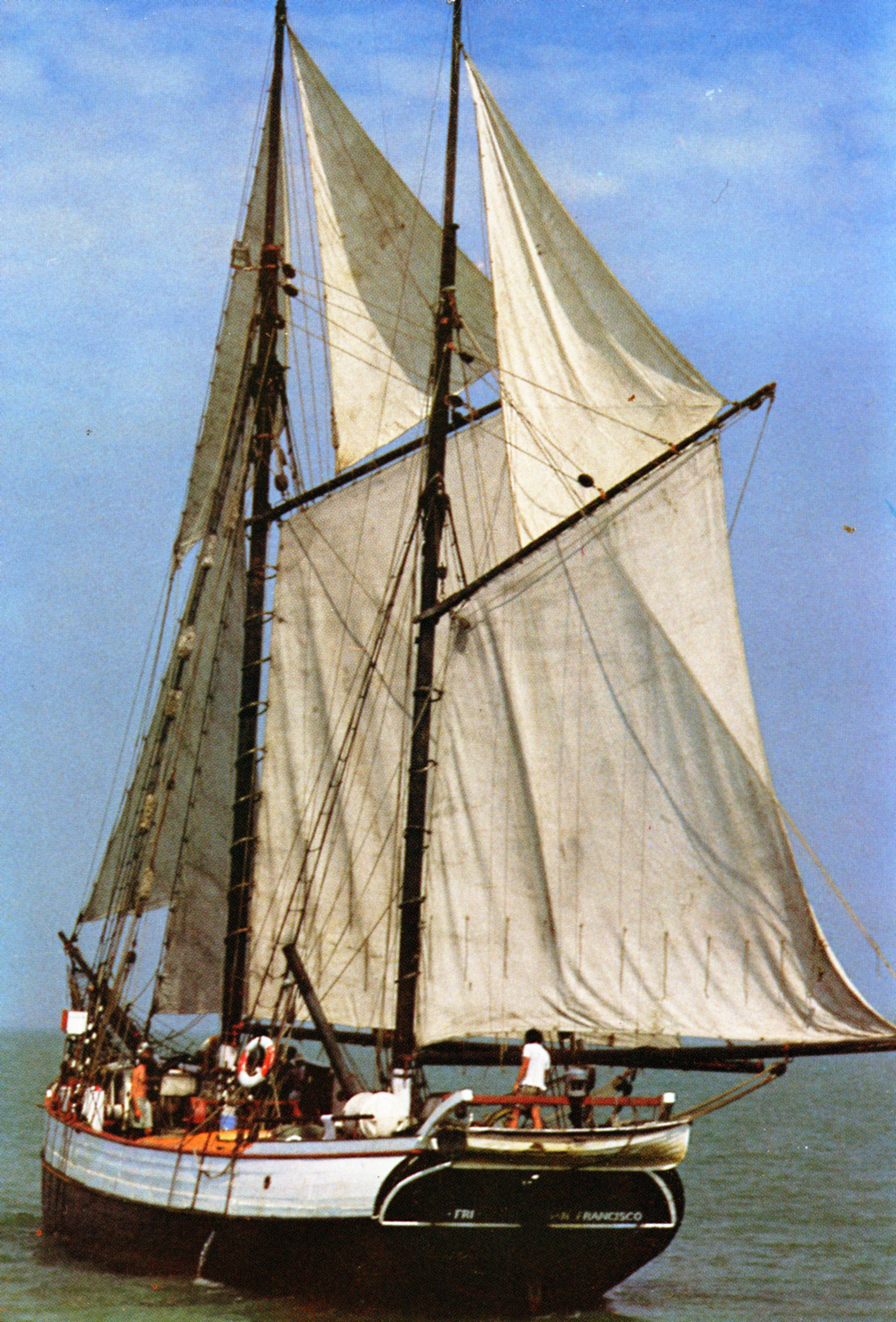

Fri, a New Zealand yacht, led a flotilla of yachts in an international protest against atmospheric nuclear tests at Moruroa in French Polynesia in 1973. Fri was an important part of a series of anti-nuclear protest campaigns out of New Zealand which lasted thirty years, from which New Zealand declared itself a nuclear-free zone which was enshrined in legislation in what became the New Zealand Nuclear Free Zone, Disarmament, and Arms Control Act 1987. In 1974, coordinated by Greenpeace New Zealand, the Fri embarked on a 3-year epic 25,000 mile (40,000 km) "Pacific Peace Odyssey" voyage, carrying the peace message to all nuclear states around the world.

== Background ==
Fri was built for sail alone; she is a Baltic coastal trader constructed out of oak in 1912 in Svendborg, Denmark. She is 32 meters (105') long with a gaff rig, hand winches, and traditional ropes and canvas sails. In 1969 she carried 60 tons of cargo on an historic passage between Northern Europe and San Francisco. In 1970 she carried fresh water to the American Indian activists who had seized and occupied Alcatraz Island from the U.S. government. In 1971 under her new owners American David Moodie and his brothers, the Fri sailed from Hawaii to New Zealand crewed by a group of hippie consumer escapes, in search of adventure and an alternative lifestyle down-under. This epic voyage to New Zealand would result in the vessel and its owners carving their name in New Zealand peace history.

== Voyage to Mururoa ==
The protest voyage of the yacht Fri in 1973 was an expedition to French Polynesia, as an act of civil disobedience to highlight the ills of French nuclear tests at Mururoa Atoll. This was part of a wider action spearheaded by the New Zealand protest movement between 1957 and 1991.

Within days of Fri's arrival in Auckland from Hawaii in April 1972, the crew of Fri were approached by Mabel Hetherington from CNDNZ (Campaign for Nuclear Disarmament (NZ)) and Barry Mitcalfe from Peace Media, and sounded out as to whether they might be interested in joining a planned flotilla of protest yachts which would sail in an act of civil disobedience into the Mururoa exclusion zone in French Polynesia to attempt to disrupt French atmospheric nuclear tests there.

CND New Zealand, which had its roots in the British anti bomb movement, had been actively campaigning against nuclear tests not only in French Polynesia but against the British atomic bomb tests in Australia and the South Pacific since the 1950s. In 1963, the Auckland CND campaign submitted its "No Bombs South of the Line" petition to the Parliament of New Zealand with 80,238 signatures calling on the government to sponsor an international conference to discuss establishing a nuclear-free zone in the Southern Hemisphere. Throughout the 1960s CNDNZ facilitated a national New Zealand public educational program on the serious health issues surrounding atmospheric nuclear testing in the region, while also promoting nationally the advantages of declaring New Zealand a nuclear-free zone.

The New Zealand Peace Media took upon itself the responsibility to organize the logistics of the campaign for a flotilla of protest yachts to sail to Mururoa. In the first instance the Fri was to act as the mother ship to a fleet of smaller yachts from around the Pacific. The Peace Media boasted branches and contacts in France, Fiji, Western Samoa, New Hebrides and Peru. David Moodie, the owner and captain of the Fri did initially express some reservations as to the preparedness of his yacht for the proposed 5391-kilometer (3350 mile) mission. These details were accommodated by the Peace Media, which took responsibility for finding his crew (selected from an international crew of activists and peacemakers) for the proposed voyage. The protest initiative sought to create sufficient negative publicity against the French and to force them towards a nuclear test ban in Polynesia. Fri was made ready and sailed from Opua to Whangārei.

On 23 March 1973 Fri sailed from New Zealand into open ocean towards Mururoa. At Mururoa Fri maintained a 53-day vigil within the test exclusion zone, just outside Mururoa Atoll and in sight of the test island, with the company of a second peace yacht from New Zealand, the Spirit of Peace, for five weeks. For many weeks her only contact was by brief radio messages with the New Zealand government warship HMNZS Otago. In a symbolic act of protest, New Zealand's Labour government of Norman Kirk sent two of its navy frigates, HMNZS Canterbury and Otago, into the test zone area. On 17 July 1973 French commandos stormed the Fri and arrested the crew and ship, impounding ship and crew firstly at Mururoa and then at Hao Island.

The publicity surrounding the Fri expedition in 1973 and the protest voyages of David McTaggart on the yacht Vega in 1972 and 1973, (McTaggart was severely beaten by French commandos in 1973), made international news and heralded an invigorated protest movement from New Zealand and Australia which eventually forced the French to cease nuclear testing in the Pacific in 1996. The French Military conducted more than 200 nuclear tests at Mururoa and Fangataufa atolls over a thirty-year period, 40 of them atmospheric. Greenpeace continued an unrelenting protest offensive in French Polynesia up until 1996. According to French journalist Luis Gonzales-Mata of Actual magazine in 1976, large numbers of Polynesians had been secretly sent on military flights to Paris for treatment for cancer. Tahitian activist Charlie Ching told a nuclear-free Pacific hui in Auckland in 1983 that more than 200 Tahitians had died from radiation-linked illnesses over 5 years. Due to the secrecy of health issues in French Polynesia, figures remained impossible to confirm. In August 2006 people of French Polynesia welcomed an official report by the French government confirming the link between an increase in the cases of thyroid cancer and France's atmospheric nuclear tests in the territory since 1966.

== See also ==
- New Zealand's nuclear-free zone
- Campaign for Nuclear Disarmament (NZ)
- Nuclear-free zone
- ANZUS - New Zealand bans nuclear ships
- Campaign for Nuclear Disarmament
- Sinking of the Rainbow Warrior
- Nuclear-Weapon-Free Zone
- Greenpeace Aotearoa New Zealand
- France and weapons of mass destruction
- Comprehensive Test Ban Treaty
- Nuclear testing
