= New Zealand nuclear-free zone =

Legal prohibition on nuclear energy or weapons within New Zealand

In 1984, Prime Minister David Lange banned nuclear-powered or nuclear-armed ships from using New Zealand ports or entering New Zealand waters. Under the New Zealand Nuclear Free Zone, Disarmament, and Arms Control Act 1987, territorial sea, land and airspace of New Zealand became nuclear-free zones. This has since remained a part of New Zealand's foreign policy.

The act prohibits "entry into the internal waters of New Zealand 12 nautical miles (22.2 km, 13 13/16 statute miles) radius by any ship whose propulsion is wholly or partly dependent on nuclear power" and bans the dumping of radioactive waste into the sea within the nuclear-free zone, as well as prohibiting any New Zealand citizen or resident "to manufacture, acquire, possess, or have any control over any nuclear explosive device." The nuclear-free zone Act does not prohibit land-based nuclear power plants, nuclear research facilities, the use of radioactive isotopes, or other land-based nuclear activities. However, no such research facilities or power plants exist currently in New Zealand.

After the Disarmament and Arms Control Act was passed by the Lange-led Labour government, the United States government suspended its ANZUS obligations to New Zealand. The legislation was a milestone in New Zealand's development as a nation and seen as an important act of sovereignty, self-determination, and cultural identity. New Zealand's four-decade anti-nuclear campaign is the only successful movement of its type in the world which resulted in the nation's nuclear-weapon-free zone status being enshrined in legislation.

In 2021, Australia entered into AUKUS pact to get support in building nuclear submarines. In response, New Zealand's prime minister Jacinda Ardern announced that Australia's new submarines will be banned from entering New Zealand's long-standing nuclear-free zone.

== Historical background ==
Initial seeds were sown for New Zealand's 1987 nuclear-free zone legislation in the late 1950s with the formation of the local Campaign for Nuclear Disarmament (CND) organisation between 1957 and 1959. In 1959, responding to rising public concern following the British hydrogen bomb tests in Australia and the Pacific, New Zealand voted in the UN to condemn nuclear testing while the UK, US and France voted against, and Australia abstained. In 1961, CND urged the New Zealand government to declare that it would not acquire or use nuclear weapons and to withdraw from nuclear alliances such as ANZUS. In 1963, the Auckland CND campaign submitted its 'No Bombs South of the Line' petition to the New Zealand parliament with 80,238 signatures calling on the government to sponsor an international conference to discuss establishing a nuclear-free-zone in the southern hemisphere. It was the biggest petition in the nation since the one in 1893 which demanded that women must have the right to vote.

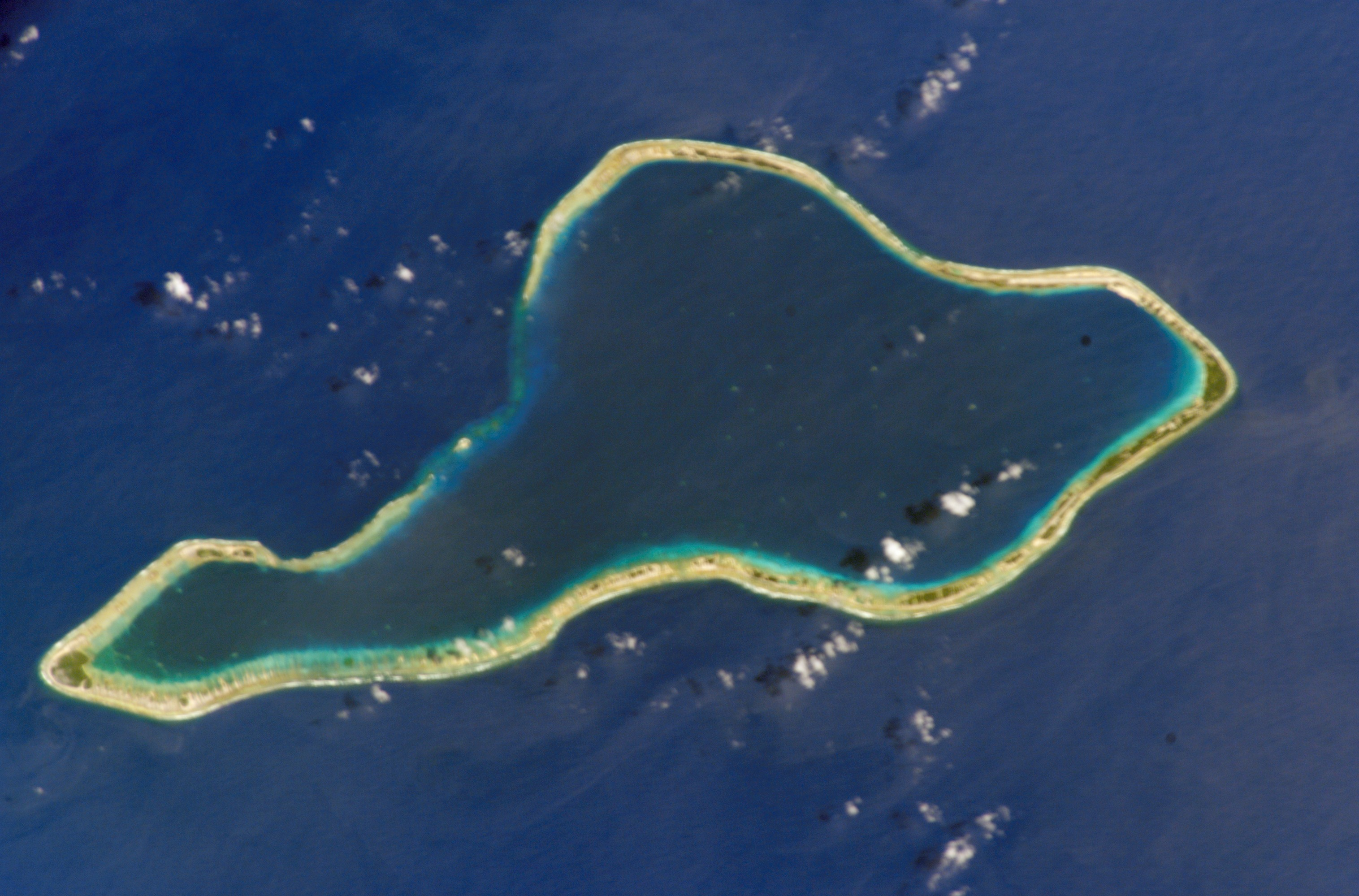
Mururoa

Mururoa atoll, and its sister atoll Fangataufa, in French Polynesia in the southern Pacific Ocean were officially established as a nuclear test site by France on 21 September 1962 and extensive nuclear testing occurred between 1966 and 1996. The first nuclear test, codenamed Aldébaran, was conducted on 2 July 1966 and forty-one atmospheric nuclear tests were conducted at Mururoa between 1966 and 1974.

In March 1976 over 20 anti-nuclear and environmental groups, including Greenpeace and Friends of the Earth, met in Wellington and formed a loose coalition called the Campaign for Non-Nuclear Futures (CNNF). The coalition's mandate was to oppose the introduction of nuclear power and to promote renewable energy alternatives such as wind, wave, solar and geothermal power. They launched Campaign Half Million. CNNF embarked on a national education exercise producing the largest petition against nuclear power in New Zealand's history with 333,087 signatures by October 1976. This represented over 10% of the country's total population of 3 million. At this time, New Zealand's only nuclear reactor was a small sub-critical reactor that had been installed at the School of Engineering of the University of Canterbury in 1962. It had been given by the United States' Atoms for Peace programme and was used for training electrical engineers in nuclear techniques. It was dismantled in 1981.

Regional anti-nuclear sentiment was consolidated in 1985 when eight of the thirteen South Pacific Forum nations signed the South Pacific Nuclear-Weapon-Free Zone Treaty or Treaty of Rarotonga.

== Mururoa protests ==
Community inspired anti-nuclear sentiments largely contributed to the New Zealand Labour Party election victory under Norman Kirk in 1972. In June 1973, the International Court of Justice (pursuant to a case launched by Australia and New Zealand) ordered that the French cease atmospheric nuclear testing at Mururoa atoll while the case was being heard by the Court. However, the French ignored this ruling.

Mururoa was the site of numerous protests by various vessels, including the Rainbow Warrior. In a symbolic act of protest the Kirk government sent two of its navy frigates, HMNZS Canterbury and Otago, into the test zone area in 1973. A Cabinet Minister (Fraser Colman) was randomly selected to accompany this official New Zealand Government protest fleet. This voyage included a number of local Kiwi peace organisations who had organised an international flotilla of protest yachts that accompanied the frigates into the Mururoa zone. Many of the early NZ peace activists and organisations were enthusiastic young hippies and students, many of whom were involved with the counter-culture and the original opposition to the Vietnam War movements.

Peace yachts attempting to disrupt the French tests sailed in coordinated protests through the Mururoa exclusion zones between 1972 and 1991. These included the voyage of the first joint Greenpeace-CND campaign in 1972 with David McTaggart, (who co-founded Greenpeace), on the yacht Vega (renamed Greenpeace III). This was followed in 1973 by a flotilla of yachts organised by the Peace Media with protest yachts Fri, Spirit of Peace, the Boy Roel, Magic Isle and the Tanmure.

During numerous voyages to Mururoa atoll the protest yachts Fri, Vegas and Greenpeace were boarded by French commandos and members of their crew assaulted and arrested. In 1973 the Vega was rammed by a French military warship and David McTaggart was severely beaten by French military police. A major change in New Zealand society caused by these Pacific campaigns was the upsurge in pro anti-nuclear sentiments in New Zealand and, as a consequence, the eventual rise of its anti-nuclear policy in 1987.

According to French journalist Luis Gonzales-Mata in Actual magazine 1976, large numbers of Polynesians had been secretly sent on military flights to Paris for treatment for cancer. Tahitian activist Charlie Ching told a nuclear-free Pacific hui in Auckland in 1983 that more than 200 Tahitians had died from radiation-linked illnesses over 5 years. Due to the secrecy of health issues in French Polynesia, these figures remained impossible to confirm.

In August 2006 people of French Polynesia welcomed an official report by the French Government confirming the link between an increase in the cases of thyroid cancer and France's atmospheric nuclear tests in the territory since 1966.

== Nuclear-free zone legislation ==
Despite the steady growth of the nuclear-free movement since the 1950s, the early 1980s National Party government was completely against tighter nuclear restrictions and instead sought closer ties with the United States, New Zealand's most powerful ally who possessed the largest nuclear arsenal in the world. Prime Minister Robert Muldoon had lost the support of some of the MPs from his own party over several environmental issues. In particular, maverick National Party Members of Parliament Marilyn Waring and Mike Minogue threatened the slight government majority. In 1984, the opposition New Zealand Labour Party proposed the nuclear-free zone legislation. Muldoon strongly opposed the proposal, fearing it might compromise New Zealand's national security. However, as he failed to secure Marilyn Waring's support on the issue, and as the National Party had a majority of only one, Muldoon decided to call a snap election, the 1984 New Zealand general election, stating that Waring's "feminist anti-nuclear stance" threatened his ability to govern. Muldoon was famously drunk when he announced the election, and ignored warnings from party president Sue Wood that the party organisation was unprepared for a campaign. The National Party lost the election, and the Labour Party formed a new government.

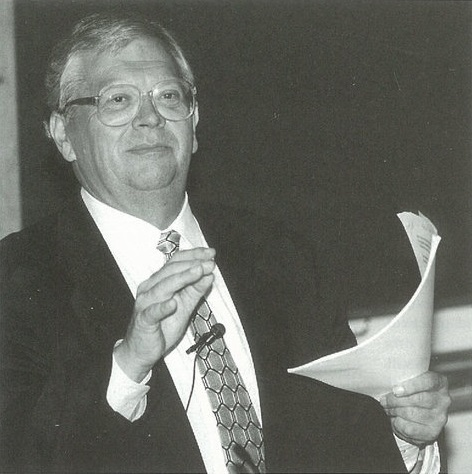
Prime Minister David Lange worked towards forging anti-nuclear sentiment as part of New Zealand's self-identity.

According to opinion polls taken before the 1984 election, 30 per cent of New Zealanders supported visits by US warships with a clear majority of 58 per cent opposed, and over 66 per cent of the population lived in locally declared nuclear-free zones. Following the victory of the New Zealand Labour Party in elections in 1984, Prime Minister David Lange barred nuclear-powered or nuclear-armed ships from using New Zealand ports or entering New Zealand waters. Reasons given were the dangers of nuclear weapons, continued nuclear testing in the South Pacific, and opposition to US President Ronald Reagan's policy of aggressively confronting the Soviet Union. Given that the United States Navy refused to confirm or deny the presence of nuclear weapons aboard ships, these laws essentially refused access to New Zealand ports for all United States Navy ships. In February 1985, a port-visit request by the United States for the USS Buchanan was refused by the New Zealand government on the basis that the Buchanan was capable of launching nuclear depth bombs. This refusal was viewed by the New Zealand public as an important statement of national sovereignty, illustrating a refusal to relax its anti-nuclear stance even at the behest of its more powerful allies. An opinion poll commissioned by the 1986 Defence Committee of Enquiry confirmed that 92 per cent now opposed nuclear weapons in New Zealand and 69 per cent opposed warship visits; 92 per cent wanted New Zealand to promote nuclear disarmament through the UN, while 88 per cent supported the promotion of nuclear-free zones.

Under the New Zealand Nuclear Free Zone, Disarmament, and Arms Control Act 1987 territorial sea and land of New Zealand became nuclear-free zones. The Act prohibits "entry into the internal waters of New Zealand 12 n. mi. (22.2 km/13-13/16 st. mi.) radius by any ship whose propulsion is wholly or partly dependent on nuclear power" and bans the dumping of radioactive waste into the sea within the nuclear-free zone, as well as prohibiting any New Zealand citizen or resident "to manufacture, acquire, possess, or have any control over any nuclear explosive device." Similar provisions were made for biological weapons. This act also enabled the New Zealand government to ensure that only unambiguously non-nuclear ships reached New Zealand's shores, making the British and American policy of neither confirming nor denying the presence of nuclear weapons or nuclear power aboard specific ships obsolete. After this Act was passed by the Labour government of David Lange, the United States government suspended its ANZUS obligations to New Zealand. The United States government viewed their nuclear weapons as an integral part of their armed forces and as such regarded any anti-nuclear efforts as anti-American. With New Zealand taking the major step to ban nuclear weapons from entering New Zealand waters the United States felt that it was important to punish New Zealand quite severely to stop any other allies from following suit. Following consultations with Australia and after negotiations with New Zealand broke down, the United States reiterated that it was suspending its treaty obligations until United States Navy ships were re-admitted to New Zealand ports, citing that New Zealand was "a friend, but not an ally". The crisis made front-page headlines for weeks in many American newspapers, while many leading American senators were quoted as expressing a deep sense of betrayal. However, David Lange did not withdraw New Zealand from ANZUS, although his government's policy led to the US's decision to suspend its treaty obligations to New Zealand. The legislation was a milestone in New Zealand's development as a nation and seen as an important act of sovereignty, self-determination and cultural identity. Further, many were driven by a sense of responsibility to support peace and the rights of all humans, not just in New Zealand, but worldwide.

New Zealand has long maintained an independent foreign policy initiative, with various Governments ignoring American and other countries' policy demands. While New Zealand meets its international responsibilities towards maintaining global peace, its pacifist based anti-nuclear stance reflects the mainstream ideology held by the majority of its residents. New Zealand's opposition to nuclear weapons is rooted in the belief that the proliferation of such weapons of mass destruction does not reflect an attempt to preserve peace in the form of a nuclear deterrent. New Zealand's nuclear-free zone option looks to remove the nation from under the nuclear umbrella.

== Rainbow Warrior affair ==
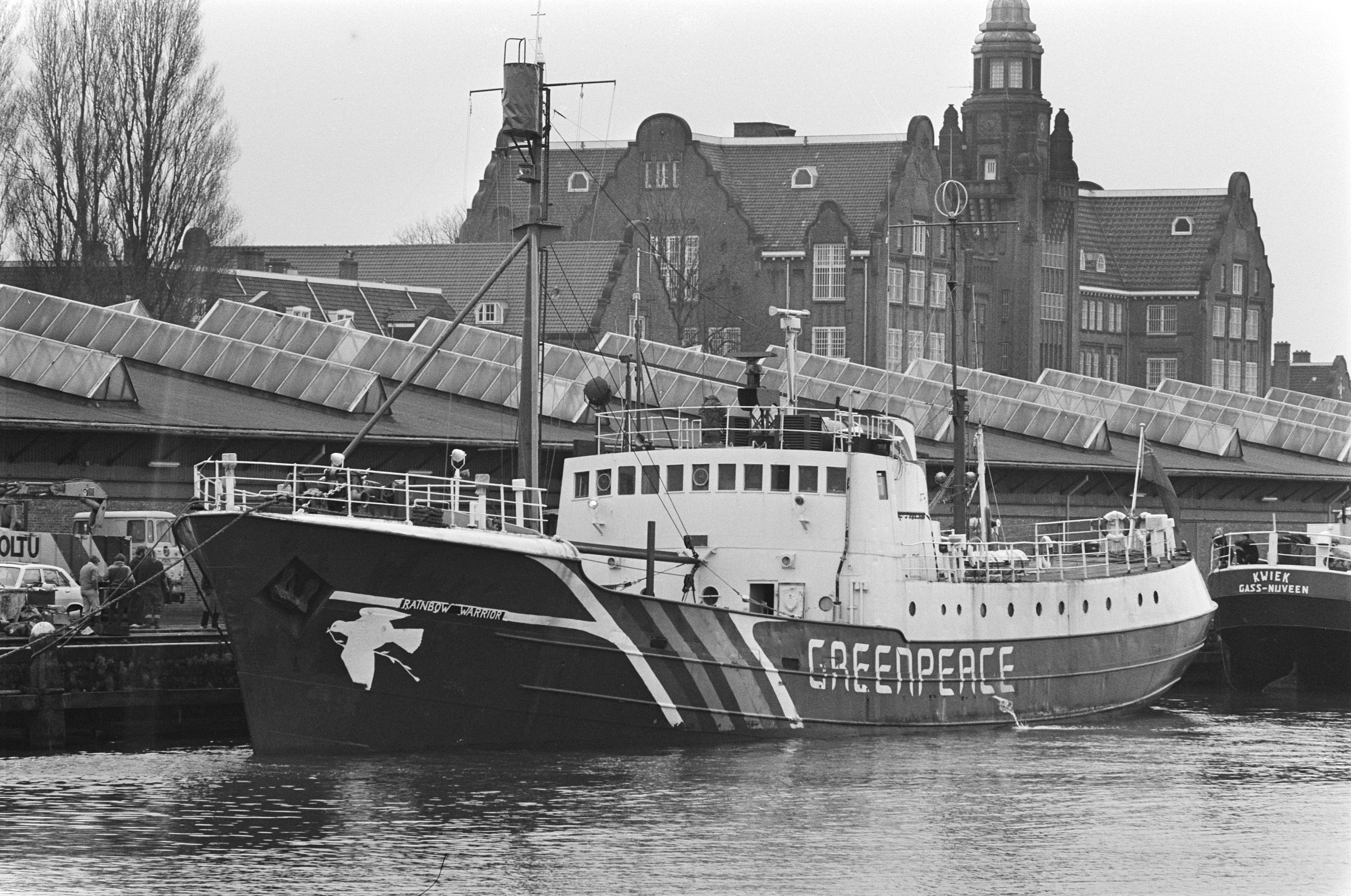
The vessel Rainbow Warrior (pictured in 1981) was bombed and sunk by French intelligence agents.

Greenpeace continued an unrelenting protest offensive in French Polynesia until 1996. The Greenpeace vessel Rainbow Warrior was sunk by the French foreign intelligence agency (DGSE) while docked in Auckland harbour, New Zealand, on 10 July 1985.

It is often speculated that the sinking of the Rainbow Warrior was an act of revenge against Greenpeace and New Zealanders themselves for their successful campaigns to enforce a nuclear weapons test ban at Mururoa. When the French DGSE agents Commander Alain Mafart and Captain Dominique Prieur were captured in New Zealand and eventually sentenced to 10 years prison for their roles in sabotage of the Rainbow Warrior and manslaughter of Fernando Pereira, the French government threatened New Zealand with trade sanctions to the European Economic Community if the pair were not released.

== Impact on diplomatic relationships ==
=== United States ===
New Zealand's nuclear movement had a major impact on diplomatic relationships with the United States. On 4 February 1985, Prime Minister David Lange declined a visit from the nuclear-capable USS Buchanan destroyer. The United States responded swiftly and stopped all intelligence flow to New Zealand. When the Labour government turned their policy into law with the New Zealand Nuclear Free Zone, Disarmament, and Arms Control Act 1987, New Zealand was effectively frozen out of ANZUS by the United States. New Zealand's diplomatic position was downgraded from being an ally to a "friend". Robert Muldoon called the Act the "ANZUS termination bill".

Despite this conflict, the bilateral trade and cultural relationship between the United States and New Zealand continued to flourish. The proportion of United States imports and exports in 1990 were greater than in 1984. Today, the ban on nuclear arms is no longer a factor straining United States and New Zealand diplomatic relations. The New Zealand Ministry of Foreign Affairs states that New Zealand and United States are close strategic partners, and they have a deep and longstanding friendship.

=== France ===
The French attack on the Rainbow Warrior "produced a sense of outrage and a serious deterioration in relations between New Zealand and France". France demanded New Zealand release the agents captured after the attack. To enforce their demand, the French Government threatened to strain New Zealand's access to the European market, and New Zealand exports to France were boycotted. Almost a year after the bombing, on 8 July 1986, United Nations Secretary-General Javier Pérez de Cuéllar announced, that New Zealand would receive an apology and compensation of $13 million from France. The attackers, Dominique Prieur and Alain Mafart were to serve their sentences in full on Hao Atoll in French Polynesia. However, both prisoners were released early and were celebrated on their arrival home to France.

In 2016, French prime minister Manuel Valls said the Rainbow Warrior bombing that took place 30 years ago was a huge mistake. France is now New Zealand's third largest trading partner within Europe. New Zealand exports goods worth more than $373 million to France and the French Pacific Islands every year, according to New Zealand Trade and Enterprise.

=== Australia ===
New Zealand has a very close and significant relationship with Australia. When New Zealand passed the New Zealand Nuclear Free Zone, Disarmament, and Arms Control Act 1987, Australia found itself torn between not offending its longstanding ally (New Zealand) and upsetting its more strategic relationship with the United States. The Australian Government was unwilling to adopt New Zealand's nuclear stand. In November 1987, the summit between the prime ministers of Australia and New Zealand avoided the discussion of nuclear policy and concentrated on strengthening economic ties between the nations. However, New Zealand's relationship with Australia was not strained. The end of the ANZUS alliance saw Australia and New Zealand embark on the Closer Defence Relations (CDR) in 1991.

On 15 September 2021, Australia entered into AUKUS pact. As per this, Australia will get support from UK and US to develop and deploy nuclear-powered submarines. New Zealand will prohibit Australian nuclear-powered submarines from entering its waters.

=== Pacific Islands ===
From a Pacific perspective, the military attack on the Rainbow Warrior only served to consolidate New Zealand's and the Pacific communities' nuclear-free zone ambitions. (Treaty of Rarotonga – South Pacific Nuclear Free Zone Treaty). The attack served to further isolate the French in that part of the world, which resulted in strong anti-French political campaigns for independence in Tahiti (see 2004 French Polynesian legislative election) and New Caledonia (see Politics of New Caledonia).

=== Japan ===
The breakdown of the ANZUS treaty placed considerable strain on the relationship between Japan and New Zealand, as the Japanese government placed importance on New Zealand's relationship with the United States. The absence of Japanese prime ministerial visits to New Zealand between 1982 and 1993 helps illustrate this unease.

== Significance of the movement ==
Jack Vowles, Professor at Victoria University of Wellington, observed that the anti-nuclear movement allowed a "new materialism" to conquer in New Zealand politics. New Zealand's anti-nuclear movement was central to an upsurge in New Zealand nationalism. There was a sense of having to 'go it alone' after the Rainbow Warrior attack, because traditional allies such as the United States and Britain sat on their hands while France blocked New Zealand exports. The nuclear-free movement drew attention to the small nation, and allowed New Zealand to create its own foreign policies independent from other countries.

== Anti-nuclear music ==
In 1982, a song called "French Letter" by New Zealand band Herbs came to express the country's anti-nuclear stance. The track, with lyrics telling the French to get out of the Pacific and 'no nukes' became a big hit and spent 11 weeks on the charts. Fourteen years later, it was re-recorded to garner support for the prevention of nuclear testing at Mururoa. Similarly, "No Nukes (The Second Letter)", "Nuclear Waste" and "Light of the Pacific" expressed much the same sentiment. "Chains", a hip-hop song by DLT featuring Che Fu, has lyrics criticizing the French for the same nuclear testing.

== Recent developments ==
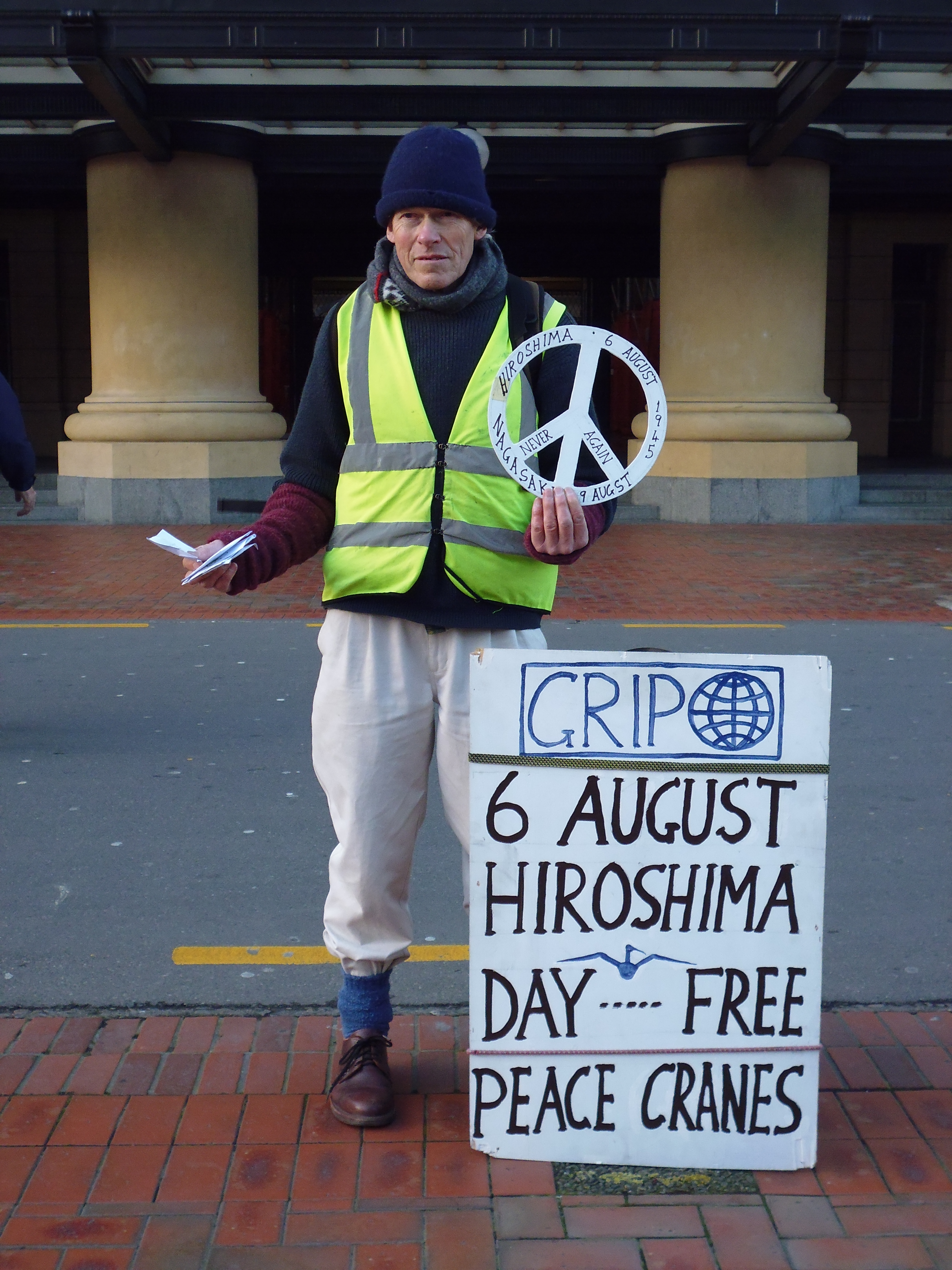
An anti-nuclear activist hands out peace cranes in Wellington

Under the fifth Labour government, its prime minister, Helen Clark, maintained New Zealand's nuclear-free zone status, a bipartisan position supported by the opposition New Zealand National Party. In a 2008 survey, 19% of New Zealanders favouring nuclear as a power source, more than both gas and coal power, but well behind wind, solar, geothermal and hydroelectricity.

The United States wants New Zealand to repeal its nuclear-free legislation, which would then allow U.S. warships carrying nuclear weapons to visit New Zealand ports. Pressure from the United States increased in 2006, with U.S. trade officials linking the repeal of the ban of American nuclear ships from New Zealand's ports to a potential free-trade agreement between the two countries. In 2004, then opposition leader Don Brash refused to confirm or deny that he told visiting US senators the nuclear ban would be repealed "by lunchtime" if he was elected prime minister. Brash quit politics after losing the 2005 election and "gone by lunchtime" became a political catchphrase in New Zealand.

Differences between the French and New Zealand governments now appear to be resolved with both countries enjoying positive trade and cultural exchanges.

On 8 June 2007 during Parliamentary debate on New Zealand's Nuclear-Free Legislations 20th Anniversary, the Hon Phil Goff (Minister for Disarmament and Arms Control) reaffirmed his Government's commitment to New Zealand's Nuclear-free Zone legislation. Phil Goff said,

I move, That this House note that 8 June 2007 is the 20th anniversary of the passing by this House of the New Zealand Nuclear Free Zone, Disarmament, and Arms Control Act 1987 and resolve that New Zealand should continue to work for a nuclear weapon – free world; and that, in striving for a world free of nuclear weapons, the House call for: the implementation and strengthening of the Nuclear Non-Proliferation Treaty, including the unequivocal undertaking made by nuclear weapon States in 2000 to move towards the total elimination of their nuclear arsenals; the expansion and strengthening of Nuclear-Weapon-Free Zones and a nuclear weapon – free Southern Hemisphere; the entry into force of the Comprehensive Nuclear-Test-Ban Treaty; the enactment of a Fissile Material Cut-off Treaty; and the universal implementation of nuclear non-proliferation instruments such as the International Convention for the Suppression of Acts of Nuclear Terrorism and United Nations Security Council Resolution 1540.

John Key promised in 2006, just after being elected leader of the National Party, that "the nuclear-free legislation will remain intact" for as long as he is the leader of the National Party.

In November 2016, USS Sampson (DDG-102) became the first US warship to call in New Zealand in 33 years.

In 2017, New Zealand signed the United Nations Treaty on the Prohibition of Nuclear Weapons. The treaty aims to ban nuclear weapons amid tensions over North Korea's nuclear and missile tests. Foreign Affairs Minister Gerry Brownlee said the treaty is "consistent with New Zealand's long-standing commitment to international nuclear disarmament efforts".

Also in 2017, a New Zealand-led proposal to help identify North Korean ships in Pacific waters was accepted by leaders at the Pacific Islands Forum. Gerry Brownlee said he was prepared to use whatever intelligence capacity necessary to help identify and stop North Korean nuclear ships in the Pacific.

In 2018, New Zealand prime minister Jacinda Ardern reinstated the ministerial portfolio of Minister for Disarmament and Arms Control. Ardern stated that it is important that the Government acknowledges New Zealand's long-held anti-nuclear stance. "The pursuit of disarmament is as vital today as it was when Norman Kirk and David Lange proclaimed New Zealand's opposition to nuclear weapons and nuclear testing in the Pacific," she said.

In 2024, former American diplomat and foreign policy advisor John Bolton criticised New Zealand's nuclear-free posture, saying, "If you want to establish the taboo for nuclear weapons, okay, I get that, but for nuclear power itself, I just think it is a mistake.".

== See also ==
- ANZUS - New Zealand bans nuclear material
- Contents of the United States diplomatic cables leak (New Zealand)#Nuclear policy
- France and weapons of mass destruction
- Foreign policy of the Ronald Reagan administration - New Zealand
- Foreign relations of New Zealand
- Greenpeace Aotearoa New Zealand
- List of protests in New Zealand
- Nagasaki and Hiroshima
- Operation Grapple
- Barry Mitcalfe
- Japan's Three Non-Nuclear Principles, a similar resolution.

== Bibliography ==
- Legal Challenges to Nuclear Weapons from Aotearoa/New Zealand, by Kate Dewes
- Stephen Kos, 1984, Interim Relief in the International Court: New Zealand and the Nuclear Test Cases, Victoria University Wellington Law Review.
