= Campaign for Nuclear Disarmament (NZ) =

Campaign for Nuclear Disarmament (NZ) was co-founded in Christchurch, New Zealand, in 1959 with the help of Elsie Locke and Mary Woodward. Mabel Hetherington, who belonged to an earlier generation of peace activists from England, was largely responsible for setting up the organization in Auckland when she moved to New Zealand after World War II. With Alison Duff and Pat Denby, Hetherington carried it in Auckland through the 1960s. It was largely from the Campaign for Nuclear Disarmament (NZ) and the Peace Media that Greenpeace New Zealand evolved.

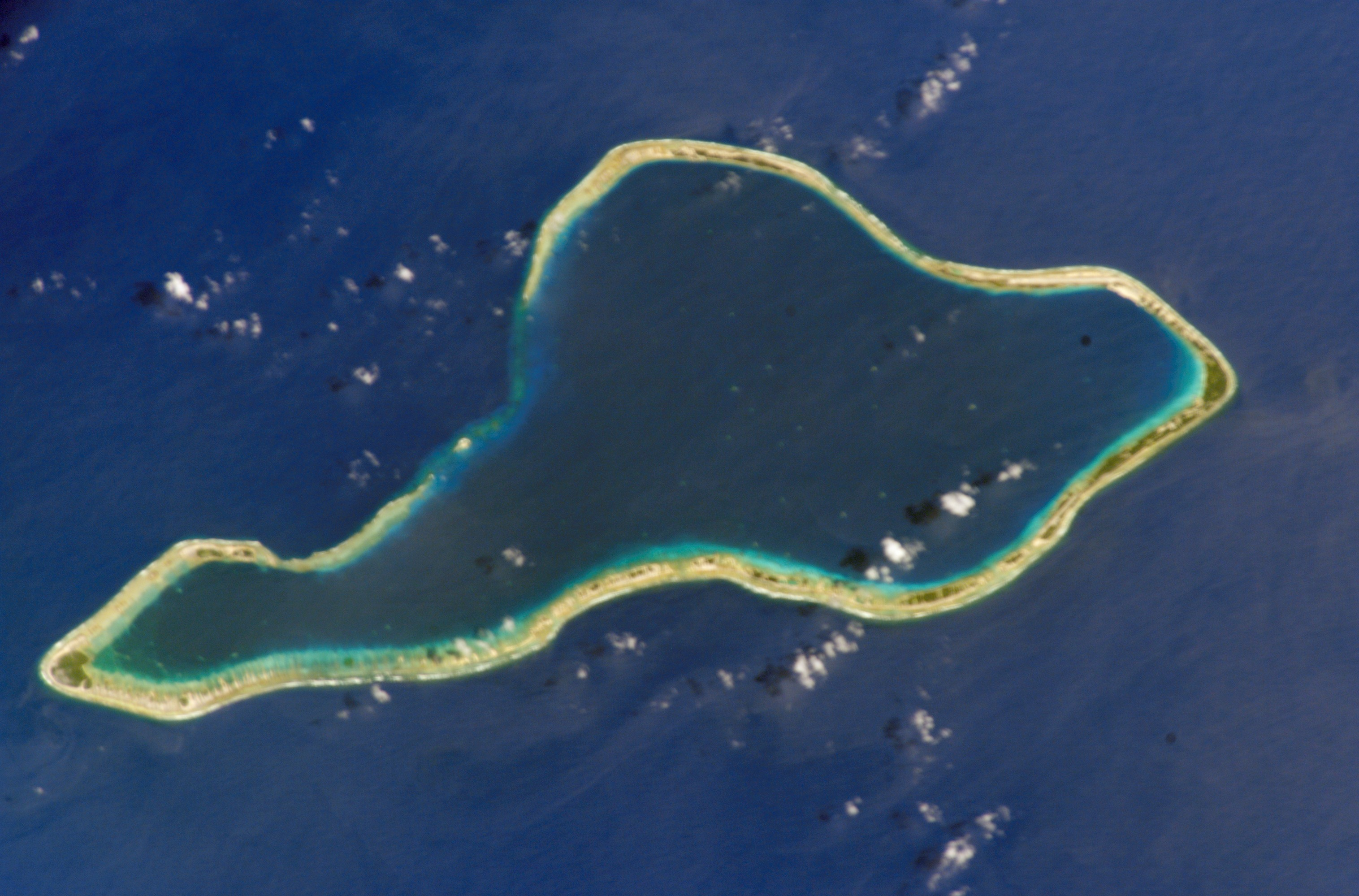
Mururoa Atoll

In 1959, responding to rising public concern following the British H-Bomb tests in Australia, New Zealand voted in the United Nations to condemn nuclear testing while the United Kingdom, United States and France voted against, and Australia abstained. In the early 1960s the Campaign for Nuclear Disarmament New Zealand organised marches and speeches throughout the country to highlight the concerns about French atmospheric nuclear tests at Mururoa atoll in French Polynesia. In 1961, with the support of other peace groups, the Campaign for Nuclear Disarmament New Zealand urged the New Zealand government to declare it "will not acquire or use nuclear weapons" and to withdraw from nuclear alliances such as ANZUS. In 1963 the organization presented the 'No Bombs South of the Line' petition with 80,238 signatures to the New Zealand Parliament calling on the government to sponsor an international conference to discuss establishing a nuclear-free-zone in the southern hemisphere. It was the biggest New Zealand petition since the one in 1893 demanding votes for women.

In 1972, in a joint campaign with Greenpeace, the yacht Vega was renamed "Greenpeace III", and it sailed in a defiant protest into the atomic exclusion zone at Mururoa Atoll. The Vega was rammed by a French military warship and David McTaggart (co-founder of Greenpeace International) was severely beaten by French military police in a second voyage in 1973. The international publicity which surrounded the incident marked the beginning of a three decade protest against nuclear testing at Mururoa with an eventual test ban implemented by the French in 1996. In 1987 the New Zealand parliament adopted the New Zealand Nuclear Free Zone, Disarmament, and Arms Control Act 1987 declaring the country and its territorial waters a nuclear-free zone.

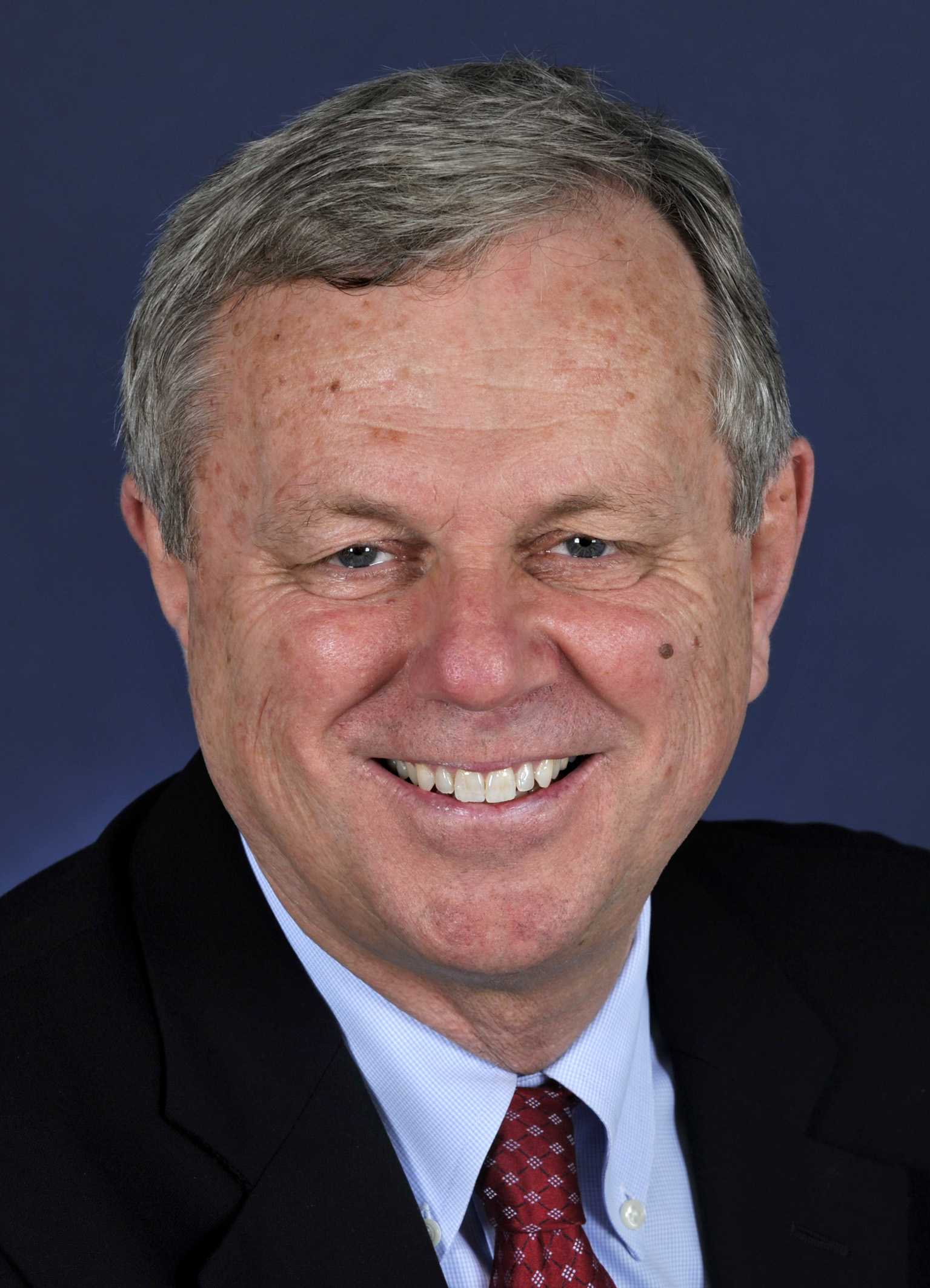
Mike Rann

Two leaders of the Campaign for Nuclear Disarmament New Zealand in the 1970s went on to parliamentary careers. President Richard Northey ONZM was MP for Eden from 1984 to 1990 and MP for Onehunga from 1993 to 1996. His Vice President, Mike Rann CNZM was Premier of South Australia from 2002 to 2011.

== See also ==
- New Zealand's nuclear-free zone
- Fri (yacht)
- Greenpeace Aotearoa New Zealand
- Nuclear-free zone
- ANZUS - New Zealand bans nuclear ships
- Campaign for Nuclear Disarmament
- Sinking of the Rainbow Warrior
- Nuclear-Weapon-Free Zone
- Treaty of Rarotonga
- Antarctic Treaty System
- Mongolian Nuclear-Weapons-Free Status
- Treaty of Tlatelolco
- African Nuclear Weapons Free Zone Treaty
- France and weapons of mass destruction
- Comprehensive Test Ban Treaty
- Foreign policy of the Ronald Reagan administration - New Zealand
