= USS Sampson (DDG-102) =

Arleigh Burke-class destroyer

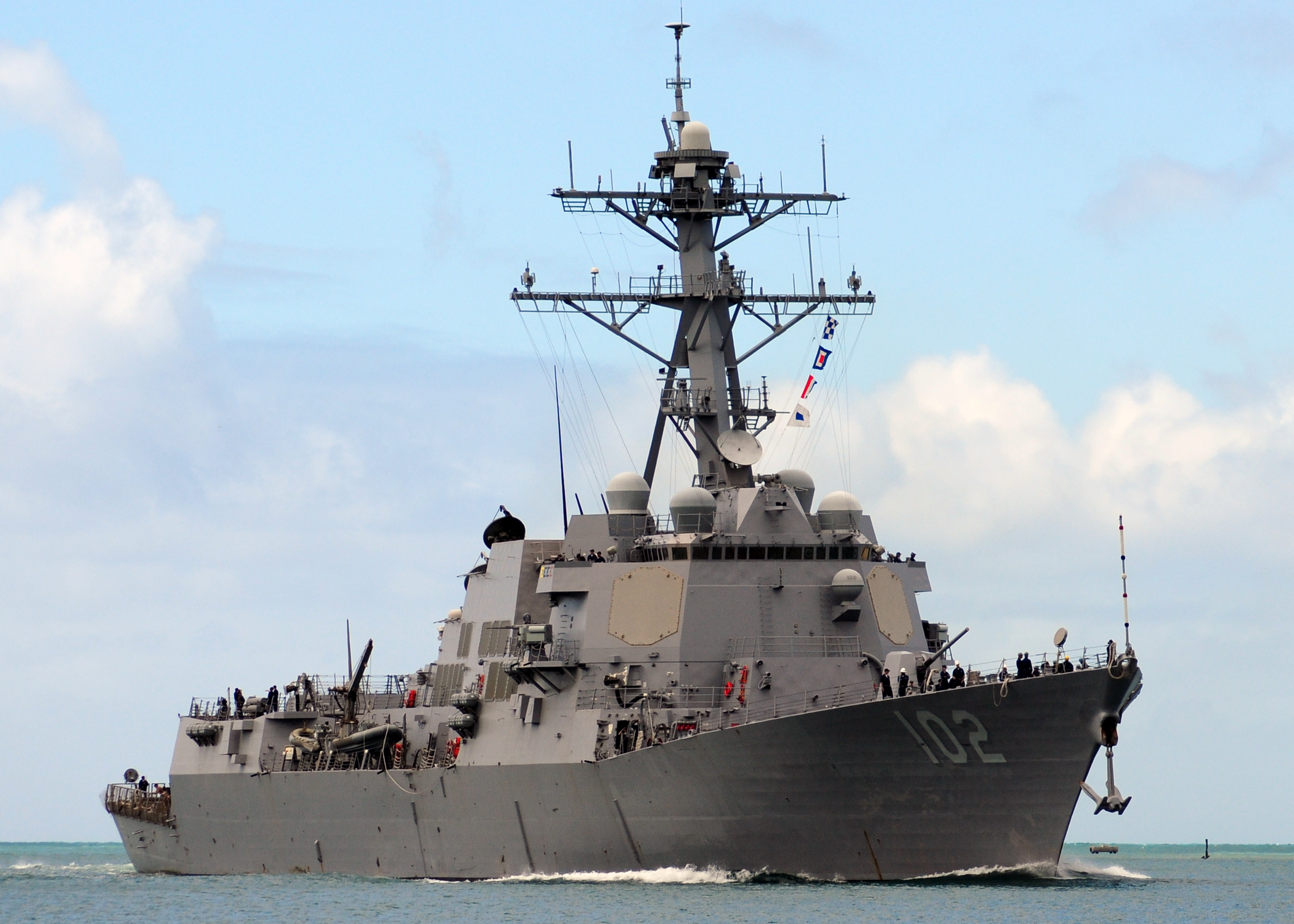
- USS Sampson at Pearl Harbor on 31 July 2010

History

United States
- Name: Sampson
- Namesake: William T. Sampson
- Ordered: 13 September 2002
- Builder: Bath Iron Works
- Laid down: 20 March 2005
- Launched: 16 September 2006
- Commissioned: 3 November 2007
- Home port: Everett
- Identification: MMSI number: 369867000; Callsign: NWTS; Hull number: DDG-102
- Motto: Through Courage and Arms
- Honours and awards: See Awards
- Status: in active service
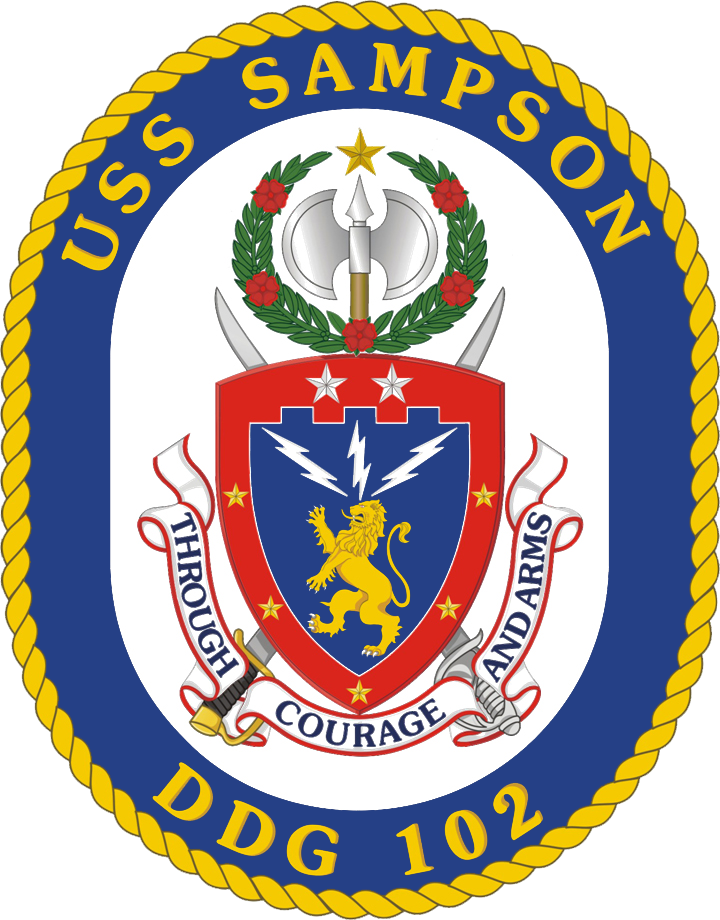
- Badge

General characteristics
- Class & type: Arleigh Burke-class destroyer
- Displacement: 9,200 tons
- Length: 509 ft 6 in (155.30 m)
- Beam: 66 ft (20 m)
- Draft: 31 ft (9.4 m)
- Propulsion: 4 × General Electric LM2500-30 gas turbines, 2 shafts, 100,000 shp (75,000 kW)
- Speed: over 30 knots (56 km/h; 35 mph)
- Complement: 383 officers and enlisted
- Armament: Guns: 1 × 5-inch (127 mm)/62 Mk 45 Mod 4 (lightweight gun); 1 × 20 mm (0.8 in) Phalanx CIWS; 2 × 25 mm (0.98 in) Mk 38 machine gun system; 4 × 0.50 in (12.7 mm) caliber guns; Missiles: 1 × 32-cell, 1 × 64-cell (96 total cells) Mk 41 vertical launching system (VLS): RIM-66M surface-to-air missile; RIM-156 surface-to-air missile; RIM-174A Standard ERAM; RIM-161 anti-ballistic missile; RIM-162 ESSM (quad-packed); BGM-109 Tomahawk cruise missile; RUM-139 vertical launch ASROC; Torpedoes: 2 × Mark 32 triple torpedo tubes: Mark 46 lightweight torpedo; Mark 50 lightweight torpedo; Mark 54 lightweight torpedo
- Aircraft carried: 2 × MH-60R Seahawk helicopters

A guided tour of USS Sampson in mid-2009

USS Sampson (DDG-102) is an Arleigh Burke-class (Flight IIA) Aegis guided missile destroyer in the United States Navy. Funding for the Flight IIA (5"/62, one 20mm CIWS variant) ship was authorized in 2002 and her keel was laid on 20 March 2005. She is the fourth US Navy ship named to honor Rear Admiral William T. Sampson.

She was built by Bath Iron Works in Bath, Maine. At her christening on 16 September 2006, the principal address was delivered by Senator Susan Collins of Maine, and the vessel was christened by Clara Parsons, great-granddaughter of Rear Admiral Sampson and daughter of William Sterling Parsons, as the ship's sponsor.

== History ==
She was commissioned in Boston, Massachusetts on 3 November 2007 and home ported in San Diego. Her maiden deployment was from August 2009 to March 2010 to the Western Pacific and Persian Gulf as part of the Nimitz carrier strike group (CSG).

After Sampson returned from an 8-month maiden deployment, she was back underway from May to August with port visits to the 103rd Portland Rose Festival and Esquimalt, British Columbia to celebrate the 100th anniversary of the Royal Canadian Navy. She then participated in Exercise RIMPAC off the coast of Hawaii. Sampson's crew was awarded two Sea Service Ribbons in 12 months.

In August 2011 Sampson pulled into South Harbor in Seattle, Washington, to participate in Seattle's Seafair celebration. In September, Sampson dispatched an inflatable boat and swimmers to retrieve about 60 bales of assorted drugs from the ocean after a small boat dumped them overboard. After that the ship participated in USS Abraham Lincoln's Composite Training Unit Exercise (COMPTUEX), in preparation for an independent deployment. In February 2012 Sampson departed San Diego for a scheduled deployment to the western Pacific and Middle East. In July, Sampson participated in at-sea phase of Cooperation Afloat Readiness and Training (CARAT) Singapore.

On 29 December 2014, Sampson was dispatched to the Java Sea to search for Indonesia AirAsia Flight 8501 that disappeared the day before.

In 2016 the ship remained assigned to Destroyer Squadron 23, working with Carrier Strike Group 11. She arrived at her new homeport, Naval Station Everett in Washington, on 26 September 2016.

The Royal New Zealand Navy (RNZN) invited the United States Navy to send a vessel to participate in the RNZN's 75th Birthday Celebrations in Auckland over the weekend of 19–21 November 2016. Sampson was the first US warship to visit New Zealand in 33 years since the New Zealand nuclear-free zone came into effect and the US suspended its obligations to New Zealand under the ANZUS treaty. New Zealand Prime Minister John Key granted approval for the ship's visit under the New Zealand's anti-nuclear law, which requires that the Prime Minister has to be satisfied that any visiting ship is not nuclear armed or powered. Soon after arriving in New Zealand, a magnitude 7.8 earthquake struck Kaikōura. Sampson along with other navy ships from Australia, Canada, Japan and Singapore were dispatched directly to the area to provide humanitarian assistance.

On 3 October 2017, Sampson departed her homeport for a scheduled deployment with the Theodore Roosevelt CSG. She returned 9 May 2018 after seven months.

In January 2022, Sampson responded to Tonga to provide assistance following the Hunga Tonga–Hunga Ha'apai eruption and tsunami.

In May 2022, Sampson was a part of Destroyer Squadron 2, along with Carrier Strike Group 3 led by the USS Abraham Lincoln.

Sampson participated in RIMPAC 2022.

== Awards ==
- Navy Unit Commendation – (July 2009 – March 2010)
- Battle "E" – (2010, 2011, 2014, 2015, 2016, 2017, 2018)
- Humanitarian Service Medal – (17–20 November 2016) 2016 Kaikōura earthquake
- Spokane Trophy – (2010)
- Arizona Memorial Trophy – (2011–2012)
- James F. Chezek Memorial Gunnery Award - (2011)
- Retention Excellence Award – (2008, 2014, 2017)
- Vice Admiral Thomas H. Copeman III Material Readiness Award – (2014)
- CNO Afloat Safety Award (PACTFLT) – (2010, 2011, 2015, 2016, 2017, 2019, 2023)

== In popular culture ==
- The ship is featured in the 2012 film Battleship where she is destroyed and sunk by aliens during the intense combat in the Pacific Ocean off the coast of Hawaii with her sister ship USS John Paul Jones.
