= Kate Dewes =

New Zealand peace activist

Kate Dewes ONZM
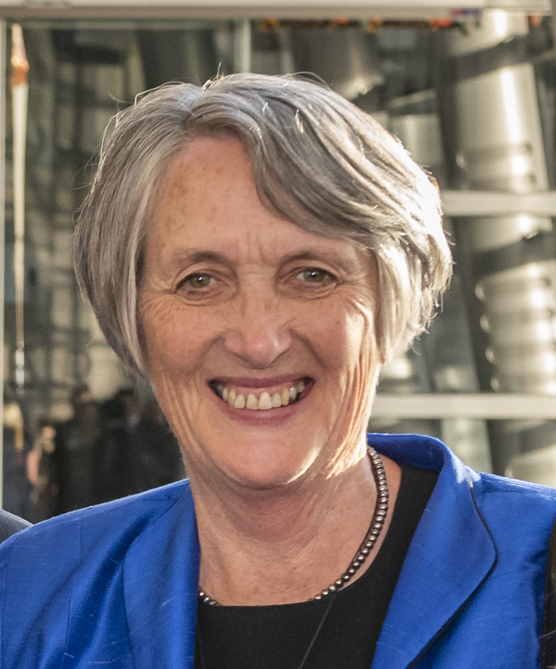
- Dewes in 2020
- Born: 1953 (age 72–73); Hāwera, New Zealand
- Occupation: Peace activist
- Known for: Disarmament matters
- Spouse: Robert Green

Academic background
- Education: University of New England (PhD)
- Thesis: The World Court Project: The Evolution and Impact of an Effective Citizens' Movement (1999)
- Doctoral advisors: Geoff Harris; John Henderson
- Influences: Hiroshima and Mururoa Atoll

Academic work
- Discipline: Peace studies
- Main interests: Anti-nuclear activism

Catherine Frances Dewes ONZM (born 1953) is a New Zealand activist for disarmament and former advisor on peace matters to two United Nations Secretaries-General. She was appointed an Officer of the New Zealand Order of Merit in the 2001 New Year Honours, for services to the peace movement.

== Education and early career ==
Dewes grew up in a "conservative family" as one of eight siblings. Her father was a veterinary surgeon.

She was head prefect at Hamilton Girls' High School. After leaving school, she studied music at the University of Canterbury and became a music teacher at Epsom Girls' Grammar. Part of the school music curriculum was a song of lament about Hiroshima and Nagasaki atomic bombings. Playing that song to her pupils inspired her to become involved in the peace movement. She joined a non-violent waterborne protest group called the Peace Squadron, aimed at preventing armed US warships from visiting Auckland Harbour.

During the late 1970s, she and a growing number of New Zealanders rallied against the United States Government's policy of “neither confirming nor denying” the presence of nuclear warheads on their warships. By 1983 public opinion had swung 72% in favour of banning warship visits.

Not long after, Dewes enrolled in a peace studies program at the University of Bradford, whilst juggling motherhood with a teaching career and a number of official positions and voluntary roles.

She is married to Robert Green, a former British Royal Navy commander, who partners with her in advocating for peace, disarmament and against nuclear proliferation.

The senior journalist, Mike Crean, in an interview with Dewes after her New Year Honour, explored that idea that the strength of her feelings came from her ancestors; for she had only recently found out that not only did her paternal great-grandmother work for peace among the northern Hawkes Bay Māori in 1870, but also her maternal grandparents had campaigned for temperance and women's suffrage in the late 19th century.

== Campaigns and professional achievements ==
Dewes successfully lobbied for the world's first national nuclear-free laws, known as the New Zealand Nuclear Free Zone, Disarmament, and Arms Control Act 1987. In 1988, she was part of a New Zealand Government delegation to the United Nations Special Session on Disarmament III, and while in New York, marched to promote New Zealand's nuclear-free zone and Nuclear Free New Zealand / Aotearoa.

She played a key role in the World Court Project that led to the 1996 historic advisory opinion by the International Court of Justice, in The Hague, which unanimously ruled that a threat to use and the use of nuclear weapons is generally illegal according to international law. She subsequently completed her doctorate at the University of New England in Australia, with a thesis entitled The World Court Project: The Evolution and Impact of an Effective Citizens' Movement.

Along with her husband, she is co-founder and co-director of the Disarmament & Security Centre (DSC), which they established at their home in Riccarton. She was also a director of the South Island Regional Office of the Aotearoa / New Zealand Peace Foundation and became Vice President of the International Peace Bureau in 1997. As a member of the Government's Pacific Advisory Committee, she championed issues important to small Pacific Island states, including the knock-on effects of past nuclear detonations at Moruroa and Fangataufu atolls. She lectured in Peace Studies at the University of Canterbury from 1986 to 1997, where she is an Adjunct Senior Fellow at the College of Arts.

From 2008 to 2012, Dewes was a member of the United Nations Secretary-General's advisory board on Disarmament Matters. She and her husband were negotiators on the first legally-binding international treaty to comprehensively prohibit nuclear weapons.

In 2019, Dewes donated the archives of the Disarmament & Security Centre to the Macmillan Brown Library at the University of Canterbury. In the same year she and her husband were mentioned as potential Nobel Peace Prize contenders.

== See also ==
- Anti-nuclear movement in New Zealand
- Ngā Tamatoa
- Solomon Yeo
- Dame Whina Cooper
