= Greenpeace Aotearoa New Zealand =

New Zealand climate change organisation

Greenpeace Aotearoa
- Founded: 1974, Auckland
- Type: Non-governmental organization
- Purpose: Environmentalism, peace
- Location: Auckland, New Zealand
- Region served: New Zealand
- Method: Direct action, lobbying, research, innovation
- Key people: Executive Director – Russel Norman
- Revenue: $NZ10.272 million (2014)
- Website: www.greenpeace.org/aotearoa/

Greenpeace Aotearoa (GPAo) is one of New Zealand's largest environmental organisations, and is a national office of the global environmental organisation Greenpeace.

== History ==
Greenpeace Aotearoa New Zealand was founded in 1974, two years after the original Greenpeace, to protect the natural environment.

Greenpeace Aotearoa New Zealand emerged from an amalgam of 1960s and 1970s NZ peace groups and activists, who had for a decade been actively promoting their opposition to the Vietnam War and nuclear testing. In particular, Campaign for Nuclear Disarmament (NZ) who were nationally campaigning against French nuclear testing in French Polynesia since 1961, culminating in an 80,238 signature petition presented to the New Zealand Government in 1962 demanding they take punitive action against the French to enforce a nuclear test ban in the Pacific. Two key NZ CND leaders in the 1970s involved with Greenpeace pursued political careers; Richard Northey ONZM as a NZ MP and Mike Rann CNZM as Premier of South Australia and Minister for Climate Change and Sustainability. Other groups in the peace collective included the NZ Peace Media, NZ Friends of the Earth, the Auckland Peace Squadron and Project Jonah.

There were two key developments in the New Zealand peace movement in 1974. The first was the official formation of the Greenpeace Foundation of New Zealand in April through the union of a collective of peace groups and their supporters. The second was the decision to send the yacht Fri on an epic voyage around the Pacific carrying the peace message to all nuclear weapons states. Fri’s Pacific Peace Odyssey, a 40,000 kilometres (25,000 mi) adventure across the Pacific and Indian Oceans was partially financed and co-ordinated by Greenpeace New Zealand and would last till 1977.

Greenpeace Aotearoa New Zealand gained national prominence in the 1970s and 1980s for its action against nuclear weapons testing in French Polynesia, and acquired huge public sympathy after the French bombing of the Greenpeace ship the Rainbow Warrior in Auckland Harbour in 1985. The long campaign against whaling championed by Greenpeace is an issue which has had the full support of the New Zealand Government since the mid-1980s.

In 2020, the organisation's name changed to Greenpeace Aotearoa.

== Campaigns ==
Greenpeace Aotearoa New Zealand also campaigns against nuclear weapons and nuclear power, deforestation, the release of genetically engineered organisms into the natural environment, climate change, and toxics. It uses tactics of non-violent direct action to draw attention to what it considers significant threats to the environment, and then lobbies for solutions.

=== Clean energy economy ===
In 2011 Greenpeace head Kumi Naidoo expressed concern that New Zealand is moving too slow to realise its clean potential. In February 2013 Greenpeace released a report calling for New Zealand's energy production to be 100 percent renewable by 2025. The Future is Here: New Jobs, New Prosperity and a New Clean Economy report suggests New Zealand makes a dramatic shift to clean energy. The report was authored by a collection of European, Australian and New Zealand academics and policy analysts. This report states that nearly 30,000 jobs could be created through the expansion of geothermal and bioenergy industries, with geothermal potentially worth over NZ$4 billion annually to the New Zealand economy.

=== Tuna fishing reform campaign ===
Greenpeace had been involved in successful pressure to reform the tuna industry in the UK. Fish aggregating devices destroy much sealife as a side effect of fishing for one species. Greenpeace in NZ and Australia started focusing on local tuna brands. Greenpeace campaigned for Sealord to put pressure on its supply chain to reduce the killing in other sea-life during tuna fishing. It culminated in Sealord making reforms to phase out tuna caught using fish aggregating devices (FAD). Sealord announced it plans to remove the method from its supply chain of canned skipjack tuna by early 2014. These floating lures attract far more than adult tuna and this destructive method is said to be globally responsible for catching about 200,000 tonnes of other marine life every year.

=== Oil at sea ===
After the Bay of Plenty Rena oil spill Greenpeace volunteers assisted in cleaning up. Greenpeace and Eastern Bay of Plenty iwi Te Whanau-a-Apanui took the NZ government to court over its decision to grant an oil exploration permit to Brazilian oil giant Petrobras for deep sea oil exploration in the Raukumara Basin off the East Cape.

=== March for Nature ===
On 8 June 2024, Greenpeace organised a "March for Nature" protest in Auckland against the Government's proposed Fast-track Approvals Bill. Greenpeace chief executive Russel Norman and Forest and Bird chief executive Nicola Tuki gave speeches criticised the proposed legislation and mining.

== Mission statement ==
- To maintain its independence, Greenpeace does not solicit or accept funding from governments, corporations or political parties.
- Greenpeace does not seek or accept donations that could compromise its independence, aims, objectives or integrity.
- Greenpeace relies on grant-support from foundations and the voluntary donations of individual supporters.
- Greenpeace is committed to the principles of non-violence, political independence and internationalism.
- Greenpeace is non-party political, it does not align itself with any political party. In exposing threats to the environment and in working to find solutions, Greenpeace claims that it has no permanent allies or enemies.

== See also ==
- New Zealand's nuclear-free zone
- Fri (yacht)
- Environment of New Zealand
- Environmental movement in New Zealand
- Green Party of Aotearoa New Zealand
