= Contents of the United States diplomatic cables leak (New Zealand) =

Content from the United States diplomatic cables leak has depicted New Zealand and related subjects extensively. The leak, which began on 28 November 2010, occurred when the website of WikiLeaks – an international new media non-profit organisation that publishes submissions of otherwise unavailable documents from anonymous news sources and news leaks – started to publish classified documents of detailed correspondence – diplomatic cables – between the United States Department of State and its diplomatic missions around the world. Since the initial release date, WikiLeaks is releasing further documents every day.

== Nuclear policy ==
New Zealand's anti-nuclear policy of the 1980s was partly motivated by economic considerations. A 2004 diplomatic cable reports, "officials who were in senior positions in the Lange government at the time the anti-nuclear policy was instituted that one of the considerations favouring the policy was that it would lead to New Zealand withdrawing or being pushed out of Anzus, thereby lessening the country's defence-spending requirements at a time of fiscal and economic crisis".

In 2005, then-U.S. Ambassador to New Zealand Charles Swindells, sought to have New Zealand reverse its anti-nuclear stance, which was formalised in 1987 by New Zealand's legal prohibition on the entry into New Zealand waters of nuclear-armed or -propelled ships, and urged his colleagues in the U.S. to investigate strategies for changing the policy, including proposing a feasibility study for a free-trade agreement between New Zealand and the U.S.

According to the cables, full collaboration between the intelligence agencies of the U.S. and New Zealand – curtailed by the U.S. in the 1980s because of New Zealand's anti-nuclear policies – were resumed in August 2009, something both governments kept secret.

The U.S. Ambassador had concerns that the anti-nuclear legislation had eroded trust in New Zealand, thereby threatening intelligence cooperation. He was reacting to a New Zealand newspaper article which stressed the Ambassador's concern that if New Zealand were expelled from the "five-eyes" arrangement, the door would be opened for the United States to conduct intelligence gathering operations against the Kiwis. The Sunday Star-Times labelled the then Ambassador's language "a clear threat" and "bully tactics."

== 2006 Fijian coup d'état ==
The diplomatic cables leak reveal that the New Zealand government was spying on the military of nearby Fiji leading up to the 2006 Fijian coup d'état. Information obtained was passed on to the U.S. The cable did not contain the information that was gathered.

== New Zealand-U.S. relations ==
John Key, while Prime Minister of New Zealand, was upset and embarrassed that U.S. President Barack Obama was too busy to see him, even though Key believed he had a firm invitation from Obama at the Asia-Pacific Economic Cooperation conference.

== Marian Hobbs ==
Marian Hobbs, New Zealand Labour Party Member of Parliament (1996–2008), was said to thoroughly deserve her nickname of Boo-boo because she had made several diplomatic blunders.

== China-New Zealand relations ==
Key is discussed in a briefing which stated that Key told Wen Jiabao, Premier of the People's Republic of China, in April 2009 that neither he nor any of his ministers would meet the Dalai Lama, the exiled Tibetan spiritual leader.

== Iraq War ==
Helen Clark, the ex Prime Minister was furious at a senior staff member at the Defence Ministry who reportedly told the U.S. Embassy that Clark had decided to send soldiers to Iraq to stop Fonterra losing lucrative United Nations Oil for Food contracts. Commenting on a U.S. communiqué to Washington, which stated that New Zealand defence officials said Clark opposed the Iraq deployment until she was told dairy giant Fonterra might lose UN "oil-for-food" contracts, Clark called the claims "simply preposterous" and said she was "flabbergasted." She denied sending non-combat troops to Iraq in 2003 to ensure one of her country's largest companies retained lucrative UN contracts.

== Guantanamo Bay detainees ==
New Zealand was requested to take in terror prisoners from Guantánamo Bay, who were Uyghur. The Acting Deputy Chief of Mission, for the United States Embassy, Katherine Hadda, met the then Ministry of Foreign Affairs and Trade chief executive Simon Murdoch to ask New Zealand to consider taking in the refugees. But he declined saying there were many strikes against New Zealand taking the refugees, including that the country had exceeded its refugee quota for 2005 and 2006 and had no Uyghur community.

== Domestic politics ==
New Zealand's Green Party were considered likely to move further left following the unexpected death of its relatively pragmatic co-leader Rod Donald. The Greens, who garnered about 7% of the party vote in the 2005 general election, were in a confidence and supply agreement with the Labour-led coalition Government. Because the party's votes were not needed for Labour to form a Parliamentary majority, they had little real influence on Government policy. But if the coalition collapsed, for example because of a defection by Foreign Minister and NZ First leader Winston Peters, Labour might have had to make concessions to the Greens to form a new Government. This would have hurt Labour's standing among National voters, although that was deemed likely to be of little concern to them.
