= HMNZS Canterbury (F421) =

1970 New Zealand ship

Coordinates: 35.1938°S 174.2944°E

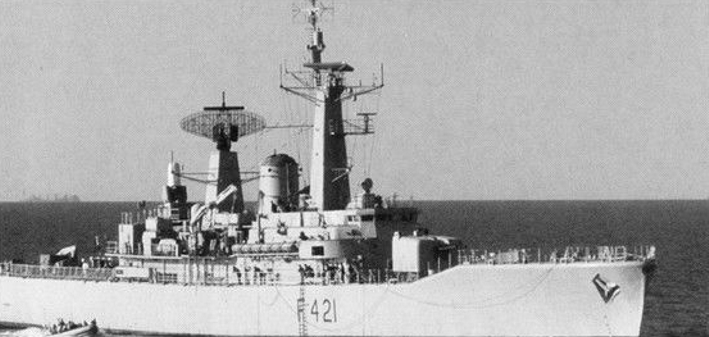

History

New Zealand
- Name: HMNZS Canterbury (F421)
- Namesake: Canterbury Region
- Operator: Royal New Zealand Navy
- Builder: Yarrow Shipbuilders
- Laid down: 12 June 1969
- Launched: 6 May 1970
- Commissioned: 22 October 1971
- Decommissioned: 21 March 2005
- Home port: Lyttelton
- Fate: Scuttled 3 November 2007 as an artificial reef

General characteristics
- Class & type: Leander-class frigate
- Displacement: 2,945 tonnes full load
- Length: 113.4 m (372 ft)
- Beam: 13.1 m (43 ft)
- Draught: 5.5 m (18 ft)
- Propulsion: 2 × Babcock & Wilcox boilers delivering steam to; 2 × English Electric geared steam turbines, 30,000 shp (22.4 MW) to 2 shafts
- Speed: 28 knots (52 km/h; 32 mph)
- Range: 3,000 nautical miles (5,600 km; 3,500 mi) at 15 knots (28 km/h; 17 mph)
- Endurance: 30 days or 5,500 nautical miles (10,200 km; 6,300 mi) at 15 knots (28 km/h; 17 mph)
- Complement: 245 + 15 officers
- Sensors & processing systems: Air Search Radar: Signal LW-08 D Band: Range 265 km (165 mi) for 2 m^{2} (22 sq ft) target; Air Surface Search Radar: Plessey Type 993 E/F Band; Navigation Radar: Kelvin Hughes Type 1006 I band; Hull Sonar: Graseby Type 750 Medium Frequency Active; Electronic Surveillance: Argo Phoenix intercept and Jammer, Telegon PST 1288 HVU; IFF system: Cossor Mk XII; Data System: Plessey/Marconi Nautis F with Link 11; Weapons Control: RCA TR-76 I Band
- Armament: 2 × Vickers 4.5"(113mm) L45 DP guns in one Mk 6 twin mounting; Sea Cat missile system removed early 1990s and replaced by Phalanx CIWS; 4 × 12.7 mm (0.5 in) AA guns; Mod 5 Mark 46 torpedoes in Mark 32 torpedo tubes; 2 × Mark 36 SRBOC Mod 1 chaff launchers
- Aircraft carried: Originally a Wasp helicopter, later a Kaman SH-2G, armed with Mod 2 ASW Mark 46 torpedoes; Maverick AGM-65(NZ) Air-to-surface missile; Depth charges; M60 machine gun

HMNZS Canterbury (F421) was one of two broad beam Leander-class frigates operated by the Royal New Zealand Navy (RNZN) from 1971 to 2005. She was built in Scotland and launched in 1970. Commissioned in 1971, Canterbury saw operational service in much of Australasia and other regions like the Persian Gulf. She undertook operations such as supporting UN sanctions against Iraq and peace-keeping in East Timor. With her sister ship HMNZS Waikato she relieved the Royal Navy frigate HMS Amazon in the Indian Ocean during the Falkland War. Early in HMNZS Canterbury's career, in 1973, she relieved the frigate HMNZS Otago, as part of a unique, Anzac, naval operation or exercise at Moruroa during anti-nuclear protests, supported by a large Royal Australian Navy tanker, providing fuel and a large platform for Australian media. This was due to F421 being a more modern RNZN frigate, with then current RN surveillance radar and ESM and a more effectively insulated frigate from nuclear fallout, with the Improved Broad Beam Leander steam plant, for example, being remote controlled and capable of unmanned operation and therefore the ship provided a more effective sealed citadel for operations in areas of nuclear explosions.

Canterbury was decommissioned in 2005. In 2007, she was scuttled in the Bay of Islands to provide a dive wreck. She lies in 38 metres (125 ft) of water.

== Operational history ==
Canterbury was the RNZN's fourth Type 12 frigate. She was laid down on 12 June 1969 by Yarrow Shipbuilders and launched 11 months later on 6 May 1970. She was the last Leander-class frigate and the last steam-driven warship to serve in New Zealand. The order for the ship went ahead after some controversy and doubt generated by the then Minister of Finance, Robert Muldoon. She was built at the end of the production line for Leanders to fit the most economical frigate building programme for the British Government, requiring 4 more Leanders for the Royal Navy, a pair for Chile (who ordered Exocet missiles) and one for RNZN.

Canterbury was built in modular form in 25 sections and then welded together on the slipway. This reduced construction time to 2.5 years but resulted in continuous disputes as neither Yarrow, the RNZN or RN had fully planned or had adequate supervision for fitting out RNZNs rather different broad beam Leander whose operations room, messing and helicopter facilities were 2 years behind or ahead of the RN 1969 patterns. She was the first Leander-class frigate to have the wells for Limbo mortars and VDS (dipping sonar) replaced and plated over to give a larger helicopter landing area, so helicopters larger than the original Westland Wasp could land and operate from the ship. A close circuit TV system was also introduced so flight deck operations could be observed and accurately controlled from the ships operation room. These innovations were refitted to most of the Royal Navy Leander fleet, including Canterbury's sisters in the NZ fleet.

In 1968, the NZ government contemplated introducing US weapons systems. In line with this Mk 32 anti-submarine torpedo tubes were fitted and a limited number of Mark 46 torpedoes were provided to supplement the older shallower diving Mk 44 torpedoes, to replace the short range Limbo mortar and to arm the Wasp helicopter. However plans for a US Edo sonar and chaff decoys and to arm the Wasp with the Anglo-French AS-12 small anti-ship missiles were not introduced due to cost and for political reasons.

During her time in service, she travelled about 960,000 nautical miles (a distance equivalent to 44 circumnavigations of the Earth), and was temporary home for 559 officers and 3,269 ratings.

Gerald Hensley, then at the New Zealand Embassy in Washington, recalled that: "The frigate "Canterbury" on its delivery voyage sailed up the Potomac River to Washington, said to be the first foreign warship to do so since the British raid in 1814. Memories were long. A barbecue was held on the ship to promote New Zealand lamb and as I came away a man said to me, 'What are these guys doing in this town? Last time they were here they burnt the place down'."

=== 1970s ===
She was sent to Moruroa Atoll in 1973 as a symbolic protest of New Zealand against French nuclear testing. F421 small GP computer was able to assess the radiation level and its up to date electronic warfare sniffers immediately identify a French P-2 Neptune, on 50,52 IFF bands sweeping the area, flying low, with radar, ECM ESM and visual search for the location of unwanted naval, protest yacht and possibly submarine activity. She observed the 'Melpomène' nuclear test carried out on 28 July 1973, part of the 1971–74 French nuclear tests. It is the assessment of RAN officers that the presence of the modern RNZN warship, Canterbury, posed significant political and operational difficulties for the French and may have reduced the 1973 tests to 5 small bombs and been a factor why France never again conducted atmospheric testing. The NZ Labour Government admitted that not only France but the UK government opposed the use of its recently delivered British frigate on this mission. The French Government claimed in 1985 that the RNZ deployment to Muroroa in 1973 was one of the 'provocations that led to the attack by the French Intelligence service and Navy on the Rainbow Warrior in 1985. In November 1974, Canterbury deployed with Destroyer Squadron 5 of the United States Pacific Fleet off the West Coast for six months, the first time a RNZN frigate had operated as an integral part of a U.S. Navy force. While such joint operation was common for the RAN, it was not repeated in the 20th Century by the RNZN, possibly because while the deployment was approved by the Kirk/Rowling 3rd Labour Government, there was considerable official comment when the frigate returned to Devonport bearing the prominent insignia, US DESRON 5 and because integrated operations were restricted by lack of funding by the following Muldoon government for common Link 10 data link communication systems and baseline HYCOR chaff defence systems, and the standard for RNZN frigates was compatibility rather than commonality with, USN FF52 Frigates

In April 1977, Canterbury and the Australian destroyer HMAS Brisbane were assigned to escort the Australian aircraft carrier HMAS Melbourne during a five-month return trip to the United Kingdom for the Queen's Silver Jubilee Naval Review. Priority for a planned new frigate (either a Type 21 frigate or Dutch Kortanear) and modernisation of HMNZS Taranaki, projects later cancelled by the Muldooon government, meant F421 received only a 12-month refit in 1980 to maximise seatime, and its mid life refit was delayed to Nov 1987 to June 1990, at a cost of $73 million, the most significant changes fitting of Dutch LW08 long range surveillance radar, Phoenix electronic warfare systems and general replacement of radar and sonar with new solid state systems in place of the original obsolescent, British equipment. Updating was similar but more limited to that carried out of HMNZS Wellington, as F421 did not receive the extra fuel tanks and greatly increased cruising range of Wellington.

=== 1980s ===
After the Argentinian invasion of the Falkland Islands in 1982, New Zealand Prime Minister Robert Muldoon offered to send Canterbury to join the Royal Navy's task force sailing south to retake the British territory. This offer was declined by the British government. Possible reasons for this included the facts that (1) The Leanders in RN service were past their prime (2) HMNZS Canterbury had had little updating since its completion in 1971 (3) It had dated, slow processing radar (4) It was not yet fitted with UK or US sourced chaff decoy systems (5) Its crew lacked practice in using them (6) Its crew had little Atlantic experience operating against Soviet naval vessels which might be observing in the South Atlantic (7) Only four Leanders, HMS Argonaut, HMS Penelope, HMS Minerva, and HMS Andromeda participated in the conflict; Bacchante joined the task group in the last week. The British government suggested as a less-controversial alternative that Muldoon send RNZN frigates to relieve the British frigate squadron in the Persian Gulf for Falkland duties. It was a difficult deployment with long stints at sea and infrequent runs ashore in very foreign ports for the crews. However they did feel closer to the Cold War action seeing significant Soviet warships and "Bear" surveillance aircraft.

Canterbury was built with a surplus 1960s RN Type 177 sonar, tuned for the Persian Gulf. The British MoD refused to fit the US Edo sonars (also planned for an RAN version of the Type 21 frigate rejected by the Australian Government in 1968) and the NZ government - on cost grounds - rejected the new Doppler 184M sonars fitted to HMS Apollo, Achilles and Diomede being built alongside Canterbury in the Yarrow yard The rather dated solid state sensors fitted were finally replaced as totally obsolescent, in the delayed mid life refit of the Canterbury between Nov 1987 and June 1990 costing $73 million. The fit was essentially similar to preceding refit of its sister broad beam, HMNZS Wellington, except Canterbury was not fitted with extra fuel tanks as RNZN and RN experience confirmed the modification difficult, dirty and expensive, on middle aged Leanders. The 1991 audit office review of the refit raised some issues, over the cost and need, for new 'long range' air surveillance, LWO8 radar, but lacked the background to assess the relevance of maintaining the Leander frigates, historical role, as a fleet radar picket for operating with the RN fleet or whether the 4.5 guns and Seacat missiles were still useful, given RN reassessment and more accurate reporting, by 1991 of their failure as AA weapons in the Falklands war of 1982.

During the Armilla patrols in 1982–83, the RNZN ships were not able to fully support the RN frigates Arrow and Galatea they were patrolling with in the Indian Ocean, because Prime Minister Muldoon refused to allow them to enter the Persian Gulf due to sensitivities with relations with Bahrain, The Arrow and Galatea were partly equipped for the missile age with computer datalinks and anti-missile decoy systems which fitting to RNZN frigates was delayed. Nevertheless, Canterbury and Galatea were later jointly awarded the Wilkinson Sword of Peace for the tour.

Canterbury was halfway across the Tasman in February 1985 when relations broke down with the US Government over nuclear ship visits. She visited the US later that year while en route to Canada for the 75th Anniversary of the Royal Canadian Navy (RCN): port visits were made to Hawaii, San Diego and San Francisco.

=== 1990s ===
Canterbury attended the 50th Anniversary of the Battle of Crete in May 1991. During that deployment, Canterbury became the last ship in the Royal New Zealand Navy to ever wear the distinctive white funnel stripe denoting the fact that she was the senior ship within the 11th Frigate Squadron when Captain Alasdair Clayton-Greene departed the ship in Lumut, Malaysia in April 1991. It was determined that only when a captain commanded a frigate (as the senior officer afloat) would this insignia be displayed – which never occurred again in the Royal New Zealand Navy.

In 1996, Canterbury was one of the ships tasked with enforcing the embargo against Iraq in Operation Delphic (under US Navy Control). She also was the first New Zealand Navy ship to visit China (in 1987), and has participated in a number of humanitarian and peace-keeping missions, for example to Samoa, Fiji or New Guinea.

Canterbury was deployed to East Timor as part of the Australian-led INTERFET peacekeeping taskforce. She conducted four patrols between 26 September to 12 December 1999. The patrols were tense, with the ship being approached by Indonesian naval vessels and Hawk jets. Her duties included escorting landing craft through territory disputed with Indonesia, being the Dili guard ship and patrolling East Timor's waters. Canterbury escorted the landing craft HMAS Tobruk when it landed a New Zealand infantry battalion in East Timor. During the deployment the ship achieved a remarkable 92% systems availability rate and had few mechanical defects, a considerable achievement for a ship of her age.

=== 2000s ===
In the early 2000s, it was becoming increasingly clear that the ship's technical systems were getting old, and mechanical faults were multiplying. In October 2003, a fire broke out in the auxiliary switchboard while the ship was off the Chatham Islands. The ship was saved through quick action from 2 ratings, one of who received the New Zealand Order of Merit for his actions in the smoke-filled switchboard room, but it was considered that major damage or even ship loss had been only barely avoided. The repairs cost NZ$1 million, and the incident, confirmed the ships life had already been dangerously overextended due to delays on orders for replacement ships with newer multi-role vessels and possibly the forlorn hope that the eight-year old RN Type 23 frigate Grafton might have been approved as a replacement, it was instead sold to Chile.

== Decommissioning and fate ==
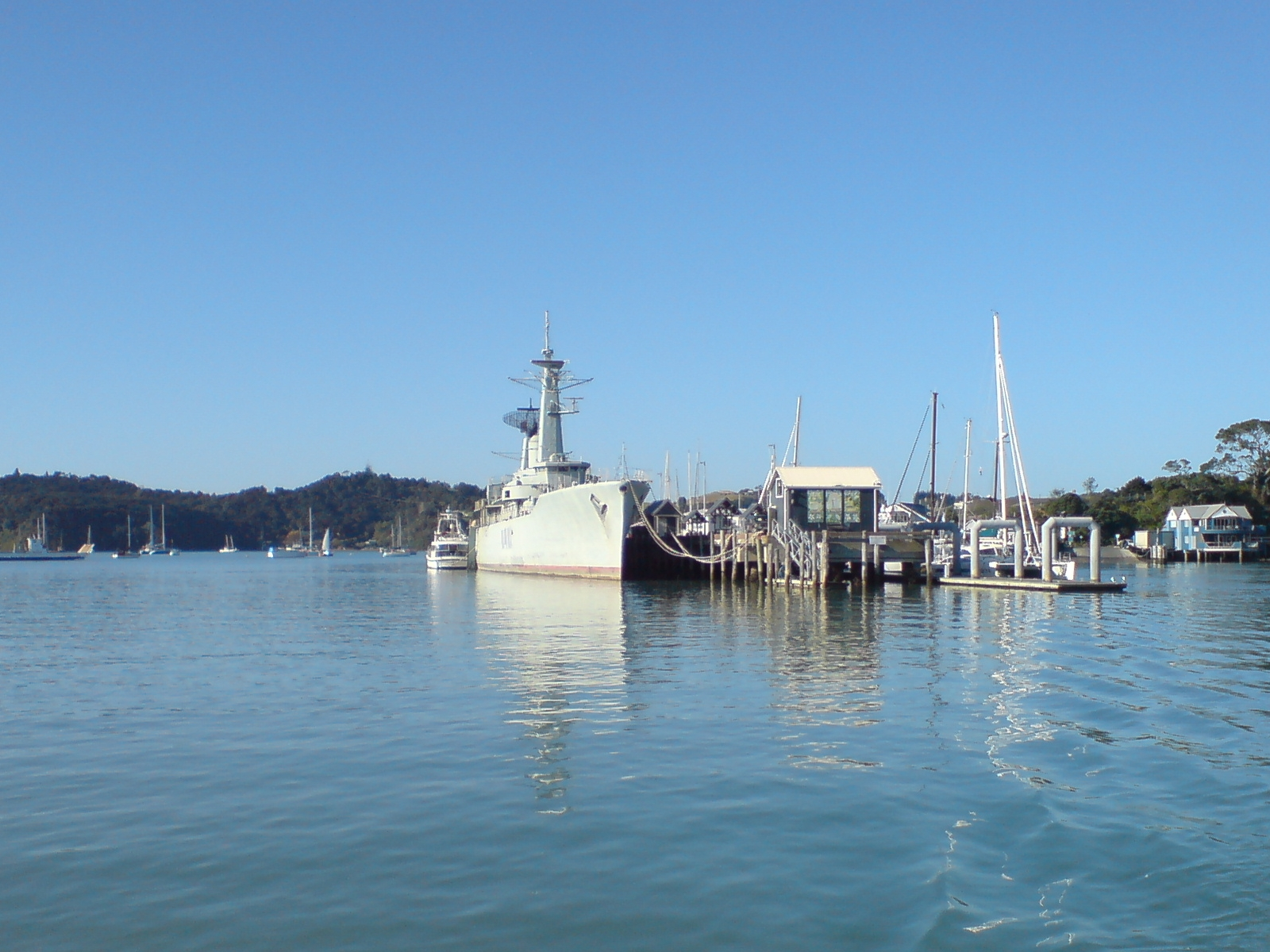
HMNZS Canterbury at Opua in June 2007, with the last of her equipment being taken off-board

After being decommissioned in 2005, there was talk of converting her into a floating hostel. However, during a 2004 inspection, corrosion of the ship's structure had been found to be too serious for her to stay afloat in the long term without very costly maintenance. Enthusiasts at the Bay of Islands Canterbury Charitable Trust proposed the idea of scuttling her as a dive wreck at Deep Water Cove in the Bay of Islands. The New Zealand Navy ships Tui and Waikato are already lying on the ground off the Tutukaka Coast, while the Greenpeace ship Rainbow Warrior was scuttled off Matauri Bay. It is hoped that the wreck, in addition to becoming an artificial reef enhancing biodiversity, will also provide additional options for the regions diving tourism. It is considered that removed scrap metal and equipment (such as ship's lockers or the propeller) will bring up to NZ$400,000 to offset the NZ$650,000 costs of cleaning up and scuttling her, while the worth to the local economy could be in the millions. The ship itself had been sold to the trust for a symbolic NZ$1.

=== Scuttling ===
It was expected that the ship would be able to be sunk late 2007, after potential contaminants and scrap materials had been stripped out, and the Department of Conservation had withdrawn its objections at the end of 2006. The intention was originally to sink her on Saturday 20 October 2007 – two days before its 36th commissioning anniversary. After some delays, on 3 November 2007 at 14:30 hrs she was eventually sunk by imported plastic explosives placed at 12 locations around the hull (totalling only 14 kg (31 lb) in weight). The sinking was prepared by Norman Greenall, once Chief Petty Officer (shipwright) on Canterbury, who has undertaken the scuttling of other New Zealand Navy ships (like HMNZS Wellington). Greenall has a somewhat colourful reputation in the navy as the person who has "sunk more of our navy ships than the enemy did in the whole of the Second World War" – however, the actual sinking of Canterbury was performed by UK company Cadre One. Canterbury now lies on the seabed in Deep Water Cove.

The frigate offers good diving, especially with the ship being mostly intact (contrary to many similar dive wrecks which have broken up) and especially when other places such as Matauri Bay were unavailable due to weather conditions.

=== Sale to Hapu interests ===
The wreck was sold to Te Rawhiti Enterprises (the local Hapū) for one dollar (the same amount that the Canterbury Trust paid the New Zealand Navy) on 15 July 2008, and the Trust was wound up and dissolved on 17 November 2008. The local Hapu will manage and market the wreck as their own to preserve their local heritage and preserve and enhance fish stocks. Due to depletion of fish stocks, a ban (known locally as a Rāhui) has been placed on fishing in the area, though there is still access to the wreck.
