= HMNZS Otago (F111) =

Frigate of the Royal New Zealand Navy

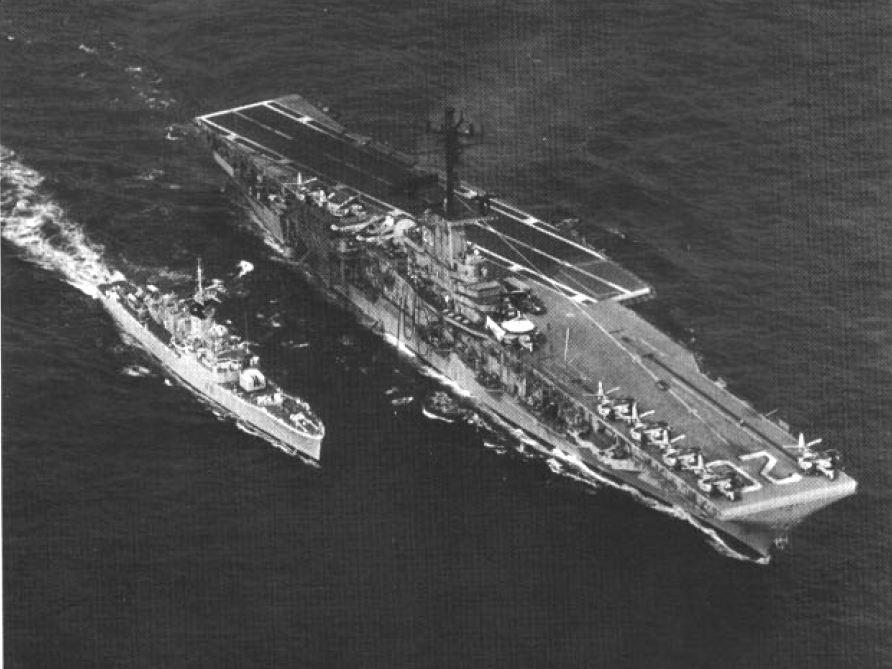
- USS Bennington refueling Otago, 1968

History

New Zealand
- Name: HMNZS Otago
- Namesake: Otago Province
- Builder: John I. Thornycroft & Company, Woolston, Hampshire
- Launched: 11 December 1958
- Commissioned: 22 June 1960
- Decommissioned: 7 November 1983
- Fate: Sold and broken up, 1987

General characteristics
- Class & type: Rothesay-class Type 12M frigate
- Displacement: 2,144 tonnes standard; 2,577 tonnes full load
- Length: 370 ft (113 m)
- Beam: 41 ft (12 m)
- Draught: 17.4 ft (5 m)
- Propulsion: 2-shaft double-reduction geared steam turbines
- Speed: 30 knots (56 km/h)
- Range: 400 tons oil fuel, 5,200 nautical miles (9,630 km) at 12 knots (22 km/h)
- Complement: originally 219, later 240
- Armament: 2 × 4.5 in (114 mm) guns; 1 × 40 mm gun; 1 × quadruple Seacat launcher; 2 × Limbo anti-submarine mortars; 12 × 21 in (533 mm) torpedo tubes (later replaced by 6 × 12.75 in (324 mm) Mk.32 torpedo tubes)

HMNZS Otago (F111) was a Rothesay-class (Type 12M) frigate acquired from the United Kingdom by the Royal New Zealand Navy (RNZN) before completion.

Otago and Taranaki were the only two Otago-class frigates; they differ from the Rothesays that served in the Royal Navy as they were not reconstructed to the Type 12I Leander-class standard with hangar and landing pad for a Westland Wasp anti-submarine helicopter as the main weapon system with torpedoes, depth charges and SS.12/AS.12 missiles to engage fast attack craft and surfaced submarines.

Otago was launched on 11 December 1958 by Princess Margaret, and was commissioned into the Royal New Zealand Navy on 22 June 1960. The ship was named after the province of Otago in New Zealand's South Island, and associated with the city of Dunedin.

The sensors of the Otago were generally updated in line with those of the Royal Navy's Rothesays to year 1980 standard but Otago unlike the RN frigates, was not fitted as a specialised anti-submarine frigates and retained the medium range air- and surface-warning Type 277Q radar, and original Type 275 and Type 262 fire control.

Otago had Seacat anti-aircraft missiles fitted in New Zealand in 1963–64.

== Design ==
The Rothesay-class was an improved version of the Whitby-class anti-submarine frigate, with nine Rothesays ordered in the 1954–55 shipbuilding programme for the British Royal Navy to supplement the six Whitbys. In February 1956, New Zealand purchased the Rothesay-class frigate Hastings, which was on order for the Royal Navy, to be renamed Otago and an additional Rothesay, to be called Taranaki. The New Zealand ships were largely the same as those built for Britain, but had revised internal arrangements, with air conditioning, bunks for the crew rather than hammocks, and cafeteria dining.

Otago was 370 feet 0 inches (112.78 m) long overall and 360 feet 0 inches (109.73 m) between perpendiculars, with a beam of 41 feet 0 inches (12.50 m) and a draught of 13 feet 6 inches (4.11 m). Displacement was 2,144 long tons (2,178 t) standard and 2,557 long tons (2,598 t) full load. The Rothesays were powered by the same Y-100 machinery used by the Whitby class. Two Babcock & Wilcox water-tube boilers fed steam at 550 pounds per square inch (3,800 kPa) and 850 °F (454 °C) to two sets of geared steam turbines which drove two propeller shafts, fitted with large (12 feet (3.7 m) diameter) slow-turning propellers. The machinery was rated at 30,000 shaft horsepower (22,000 kW), giving a speed of 29.5 knots (33.9 mph; 54.6 km/h). The ship had a crew of 219 officers and other ranks.

A twin 4.5-inch (113 mm) Mark 6 gun mount was fitted forward, with 350 rounds of ammunition carried, with a single Mk 9 L60 40 mm Bofors guns as close in armament. The design anti-submarine armament consisted of twelve 21-inch torpedo-tubes (eight fixed and two twin rotating mounts) for Mark 20E Bidder homing anti-submarine torpedoes, backed up by two Limbo anti-submarine mortars fitted aft. The Bidder homing torpedoes proved unsuccessful however, being too slow to catch modern submarines, and the torpedo tubes were soon removed, although Otago and Taranaki were both delivered with them. The ship was fitted with a Type 293Q surface/air search radar on the foremast, with a Type 277 height-finding radar on a short mast forward of the foremast. A Mark 6M fire control system (including a Type 275 radar) for the 4.5 inch guns was mounted above the ship's bridge, while a Type 974 navigation radar was also fitted. The ship's sonar fit consisted of Type 174 search, Type 170 fire control sonar for Limbo and a Type 162 sonar for classifying targets on the sea floor.

== Service history ==
Otago took part in various Southeast Asia Treaty Organization (SEATO) deployments and took part in a protest against French nuclear tests at Mururoa Atoll in 1973. The protest voyage was opposed by the National Party Their leader, Jack Marshall called the deployment 'irresponsible' and a 'futile, empty gesture' and RNZN officers, noting the Kirk Government approved the exercise on the day the International Labour Organisation and NZFOL called for stopping the French bomb tests as an exercise ordered by FOL President Tom Skinner and the New Zealand Federation of Labour Executive Otago, observed the "Euterpe" test carried out on 28 July 1973, part of the 1971-74 nuclear test series.

In the weeks preceding the bomb test, HMNZS Otago was constantly monitored and tested by French Navy Lockheed 2PV-5 Neptune maritime patrol aircraft. The instructions from the Cabinet, CNS and CDS were that Otago project authority, but not engage, if seriously challenged by French frigates, RNZN frigates should do everything to increase distance and not use weaponry. To avoid the embarrassment to the RNZN, the frigate was fully armed with 4.5 shells (all fused on the voyage North, on the order of Cpt Tyrell) with live shells in the loading hoppers and extra shells in the turrets. To overcome any problems with transfer belts for shells and charges from magazine below. To oppose any arrest or boarding effort by the French Navy. Seacat missiles were fitted on the launcher, on the orders of Cpt Tyrrell while Otago was patrolling in French territory waters, mortars, small arms and torpedoes, were also carried. The Neptune P2 flew various patterns fully testing the Otago's radar, electronic warfare and IFF passive and active capabilities. HMNZS Otago was flying three battle ensigns, officially as an aid to recognition and to signal this was a RNZN operational warship on a political not a protest mission. France may have considered it an act of war and it is unlikely the RN was approached on the right and wisdom of flying an associated battle ensign on this exercise. A couple of Soviet research ships were out of sight 25 nm distant and two large USN naval auxiliary and spy ships, USS Corpus Christi Bay and USS Wheeling (T-AGM-8). The Royal Navy had deployed an RFA tanker and an amphibious landing ship to allow for evacuating the Pitcairn Islands if the French conducted a much larger "megabomb" test but that did not happen. The objective was to lead an NZ government and world protest against 'illegal' atmospheric testing, demonstrate ability for 'innocent passage' in international waters outside the French territorial 12-mile zone and, while avoiding confrontation, maintain the right to self defence. On the insistence of the PM, executive and CEO of Foreign Affairs (and possibly their Australian counterparts, who reduced RAN involvement from HMAS Sydney and a destroyer to HMAS Supply a tanker with six 40mm Bofors guns (2 km range) so the RNZN frigates forward in intermediate zone would face any immediate obstruction from the French Navy only the captain and operations officers were informed of the specific instructions - that in certain contingencies French action, fire and attempts to arrest or board the RNZN frigates would be arrested. Unaware of the specific instructions the wardroom of the Otago was increasingly concerned by the aggressive and unpredictable evolutions run by Cpt Tyrell in French waters.

The small French frigate force probably indicated only a small nuclear trigger test of 5.4 kilotons was likely. Otago observed it from 21.5 miles and the crew was held in the enclosed citadel for only 20 seconds before allowed on the upper deck to observe the nuclear cloud. Cdr Tyrrell had witnessed the 1957 Operation Grapple hydrogen bomb test at Kiritamati and saw the explosion as puny in comparison and well within safe limits for the crew at the distance.

The NZBC journalists, Shaun Brown and David Barber of New Zealand Press Association on Otago, saw it as an "angry... red fireball" and rising white mushroom cloud.

In operations Otago needed the support of an RAN tanker due to the relatively short range of the Type 12 frigates which was just sufficient for a one way trip from Auckland to Mururora or to operate for 36 hours at 25–30 knots (46–56 km/h; 29–35 mph) in all-out anti-submarine operations in the Greenland-Iceland-UK gap. The Rothesays were designed for such sweeps and as aircraft carrier escorts with fleet tankers in the group sprinting and searching. A solution became possible when the redesign of the Leander for the NZ in 1968-69 for HMNZS Canterbury; removal of the anti-submarine mortars giving more internal space below deck.

Proposals to fit a hangar and landing pad to Otago without complete reconstruction were rejected by RNZN CNS in the 1970s as jeopardizing the RNZN case for a new combat ship. The Limbo mortars were finally removed after last firing on a recruitment cruise off Timaru in mid-1974, immediately before the frigates July 1974 – 1975 mid-life refit.

Otago continued as the third combat ship in the three frigate fleet designated by the 1978 Defence Review. In the second half of 1979, the ship had another extensive refit, with its Seacat missile system repaired by using stored parts from HMNZS Taranaki's system. In early 1980, the ship deployed to Pearl Harbor and later the West Coast of the United States and Canada for extensive exercises with the United States Navy and Canadian Maritime Command firing hundreds of rounds of 4.5-inch shells. Under the command of Cmdr Karl Moen, who described Otago as the "one true fighting ship in the RNZN" with Ltd Cmdr Robert Martin as his second. Martin assumed command during a final six-month refit, leaving the ship on 7 April 1982. Even at the time of the Falklands War, the Captain of Otago and the Minister of Defence, David Thomson, declared the ship to still be fully combat capable.

Otago was decommissioned at Devonport, Auckland in November 1983 and was slowly stripped. In July 1987, she was sold to Pacific Metal Industries Ltd and the following month she towed across to the Western Viaduct for demolition, which was completed in four months.
