= ANZUS =

1951 collective security treaty between Australia, New Zealand, and the US

Australia, New Zealand, United States Security Treaty
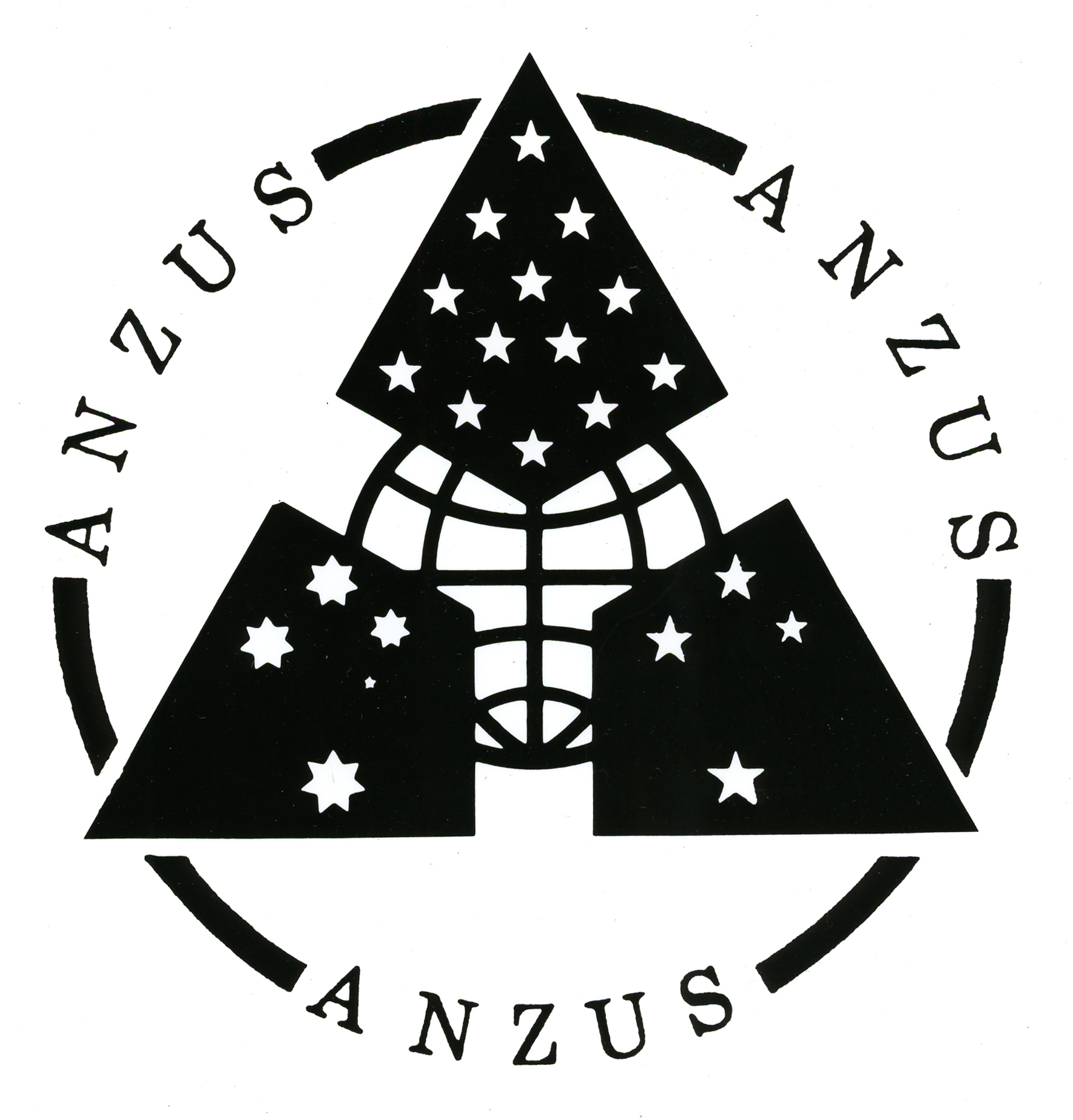
- Type: Collective security agreement
- Signed: 1 September 1951
- Location: San Francisco, United States
- Effective: 29 April 1952
- Parties: Australia; New Zealand (partially suspended); United States
- Citations: [1952] ATS 2 (full text)

The Australia, New Zealand, United States Security Treaty (ANZUS or ANZUS Treaty) is a collective security agreement between Australia, New Zealand, and the United States that was signed in 1951, and from which New Zealand has been partially suspended since 1986. It firstly recommits the parties to the purposes of the United Nations, prohibiting the use of force or threats except in self-defence. The following provisions require the parties to maintain their "capacity to resist armed attack", consult with each other on security matters in the Pacific and declare that an armed attack on any of the parties "would be dangerous to [each signatory's] peace and safety" and that each signatory "would act to meet the common danger in accordance with its constitutional processes". It also provides for a council of the signatories foreign ministers, in which the implementation of the treaty can be discussed.

The treaty was one of a series that the United States formed in the 1949–1955 era as part of its collective response to the threat of communism during the Cold War. New Zealand was suspended from ANZUS in 1986 as it initiated a nuclear-free zone in its territorial waters. In late 2012, the United States lifted a 26-year-old ban on visits by New Zealand warships to US Department of Defense and US Coast Guard bases around the world. New Zealand maintains a nuclear-free zone as part of its foreign policy and is partially suspended from ANZUS, as the United States maintains an ambiguous policy whether or not the warships carry nuclear weapons and operates numerous nuclear-powered aircraft carriers and submarines; however New Zealand resumed key areas of the ANZUS treaty in 2007.

== Treaty structure ==
The treaty was previously a full three-way defence pact, but was disrupted following a dispute between New Zealand and the United States in 1984 over visiting rights for ships and submarines capable of carrying nuclear arms or nuclear-powered ships of the US Navy to New Zealand ports. The treaty has lapsed between the United States and New Zealand, but remains separately in force between both of those states and Australia. In 2000, the United States opened its ports to the Royal New Zealand Navy once again, and under the presidency of Bill Clinton in the US and the government of Helen Clark in New Zealand, the countries have since reestablished bilateral cooperation on defence and security.

While ANZUS is commonly recognised to have split in 1984, the Australia–US alliance remains in full force. Heads of defence of one or both states often have joined the annual ministerial meetings, which are supplemented by consultations between the US Combatant Commander Pacific and the Australian Chief of Defence Force. There are also regular civilian and military consultations between the two governments at lower levels. Annual meetings to discuss ANZUS defence matters take place between the United States Secretaries of Defense and State and the Australian Ministers of Defence and Foreign Affairs, and are known by the acronym AUSMIN.

Unlike the North Atlantic Treaty Organization (NATO), ANZUS has no integrated defence structure or dedicated forces. Nevertheless, Australia and the United States conduct a variety of joint activities. These include military exercises ranging from naval and landing exercises at the task-group level to battalion-level special forces training, assigning officers to each other's armed services, and standardising equipment and operational doctrine. The two countries also operate several joint-defence facilities in Australia, mainly ground stations for spy satellite, and signals intelligence espionage in Southeast and East Asia as part of the ECHELON network.

During the 2010s, New Zealand and the US resumed a close relationship, although it is unclear whether the revived partnership falls under the aegis of the 1951 trilateral treaty. The Wellington Declaration of 2010 defined a "strategic partnership" between New Zealand and the US, and New Zealand joined the biennial Rim of the Pacific military exercise off Hawaii in 2012, for the first time since 1984. The US prohibition on New Zealand ships making port at US bases was lifted after the 2012 exercise.

== History ==
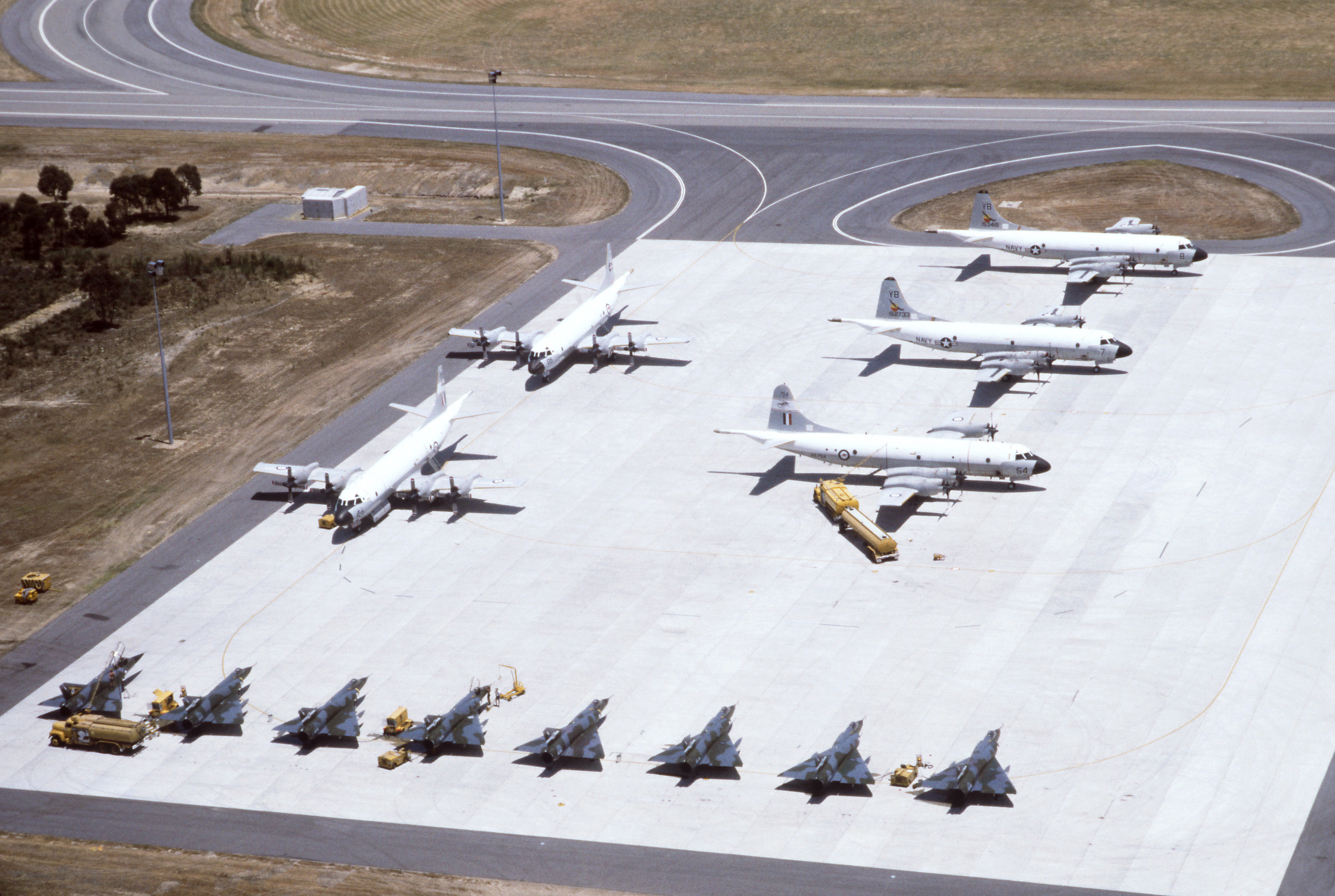
Australian, New Zealand, and United States aircraft during a military exercise in 1982

=== Origins ===
Following the fall of Singapore and the decline of British power in Asia, Australia began to search for other partners to ensure its security. Australia and New Zealand also felt threatened by the possibility of a resurgent Japan and the spread of communism to their North. Percy Spender, Australia's minister for external affairs, sought a broader Pacific security agreement in 1950 which would include Australia, the UK, other Commonwealth countries and the United States. The latter's participation was essential, with Spender stating the agreement "would be meaningless without the United States". At this point however, both the UK and the US were uninterested in such an agreement, with both seeking to limit their engagement with Asia.

The beginning of the Korean War in mid-1950 changed American views. Australia committed to the Korean War before the United Kingdom and continued to further court the Americans. While Australia could not convince the US to sign a harsher peace treaty with Japan to restrain future military aggression, they did press for further assurances that they would retain a voice in Pacific security decisions and for an American security commitment in return for their approval of the treaty. The United States was initially reluctant, but the need to strengthen the West against communism grew with the communist victory in the Chinese Civil War in 1949 and the 1950–1953 Korean War. The treaty allayed antipodean fears that such a peace would allow Japan to threaten them again.

The United States was initially reluctant, with the president instead offering an informal guarantee of protection. However, Australia pushed for a more formal agreement, with Spender noting that "Presidents come and presidents go." However, the treaty did not include an automatic commitment to armed assistance like in NATO, with Spender expecting that this could not be ratified by the US Senate, who would wish to retain the congressional power to declare war. Instead, the text of the treaty mirrored the text of the Monroe Doctrine which stated that attacks on the American continent would be seen as "dangerous to its own peace and security".

The resulting treaty was concluded at San Francisco on 1 September 1951, and entered into force on 29 April 1952.

=== Korea, Malaysia, Borneo and Vietnam ===
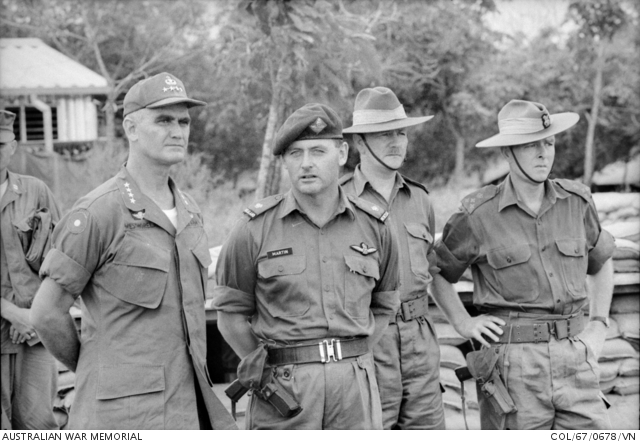
U.S. General Westmoreland talks to the commander of the New Zealand artillery battery alongside Australian senior officers in Vietnam, in 1967.

The treaty itself was not a source of debate for over 30 years, with New Zealand participating as part of the British Commonwealth Forces in the Korean War and the Malayan Emergency, followed by the Indonesia–Malaysia confrontation, and directly as part of ANZUS in the Vietnam War. The Vietnam War was the first conflict New Zealand entered that did not involve the British or any other Commonwealth countries outside of Australia. As an ANZUS member New Zealand contributed military and non military assistance to the United States war effort in Vietnam from 1963 until 1975. New Zealand and Australian combat forces were withdrawn in 1972 and New Zealand non-military medical aid continued until 1975.

=== Australian reservations about the MX missile ===
In 1983, the Reagan Administration approached Australia with proposals for testing the new generation of American intercontinental ballistic missiles, the MX missile. American test ranges in the Pacific were insufficient for testing the new long-range missiles and the United States military wished to use the Tasman Sea as a target area. Australian Prime Minister Malcolm Fraser of the Liberal Party had agreed to provide monitoring sites near Sydney for this purpose. However, in 1985, the newly elected Prime Minister Bob Hawke, of the Labor Party, withdrew Australia from the testing programme, sparking criticism from the Reagan Administration. Hawke had been pressured into doing so by the left-wing faction of the Labor Party, which opposed the proposed MX missile test in the Tasman Sea. The Labor left-wing faction also strongly sympathized with the New Zealand Fourth Labour Government's anti-nuclear policy and supported a South Pacific Nuclear Free Zone.

To preserve its joint Australian-US military communications facilities, the Reagan Administration also had to assure the Hawke Government that those installations would not be used in the Strategic Defense Initiative project, which the Australian Labor Party strongly opposed. Despite these disagreements, the Hawke Labor Government still remained supportive of the ANZUS security treaty. It also did not support its New Zealand counterpart's ban on nuclear-armed and nuclear-powered ships. Following the ANZUS Split in February 1985, the Australian government also endorsed the Reagan Administration's plans to cancel trilateral military exercises and to postpone the ANZUS foreign ministers conference. However, it still continued to maintain bilateral military ties and continued to share intelligence information with New Zealand. Unlike New Zealand, Australia continued to allow US warships to visit its ports and to participate in joint military exercises with the United States.

=== New Zealand bans nuclear material ===
In 1985, the nature of the ANZUS alliance changed significantly. Due to a current of anti-nuclear sentiment within New Zealand, tension had long been present between ANZUS members as the United States is a declared nuclear power. France, a naval power and a declared nuclear power, had been conducting nuclear tests on South Pacific Islands. Following the victory of the New Zealand Labour Party in election in 1984, Prime Minister David Lange barred nuclear-powered or nuclear-armed ships from using New Zealand ports or entering New Zealand waters. Reasons given were the dangers of nuclear weapons, continued French nuclear testing in the South Pacific, and opposition to US president Ronald Reagan's policy of aggressively confronting the Soviet Union.

Given that the United States Navy had a policy of deliberate ambiguity during the Cold War and refused to confirm or deny the presence of nuclear weapons aboard its warships and support ships, these laws essentially refused access to New Zealand ports for all United States Navy vessels. In February 1985, a port-visit request by the United States for the guided-missile destroyer USS Buchanan was refused by New Zealand, as the Buchanan was capable of launching RUR-5 ASROC nuclear depth bombs. As this occurred after the government unofficially invited the United States to send a ship, the refusal of access was interpreted by the United States as a deliberate slight.

According to opinion polls taken before the 1984 election, only 30 per cent of New Zealanders supported visits by US warships with a clear majority of 58 per cent opposed, and over 66 per cent of the population lived in locally declared nuclear-free zones. An opinion poll commissioned by the 1986 Defence Committee of Enquiry confirmed that 92 per cent now opposed nuclear weapons in New Zealand and 69 per cent opposed warship visits; 92 per cent wanted New Zealand to promote nuclear disarmament through the UN, while 88 per cent supported the promotion of nuclear-free zones.

=== United States suspends obligations to New Zealand ===
After consultations with Australia and after negotiations with New Zealand broke down, the United States announced that it was suspending its treaty obligations to New Zealand until United States Navy ships were re-admitted to New Zealand ports, citing that New Zealand was "a friend, but not an ally". The crisis made front-page headlines for weeks in many American newspapers. David Lange did not withdraw New Zealand from ANZUS, although his government's policy led to the US's decision to suspend its treaty obligations to New Zealand.

An opinion poll in New Zealand in 1991, showed 54% of those sampled preferred to let the treaty lapse rather than accept visits again by nuclear-armed or nuclear-powered vessels. The policy did not become law until 8 June 1987 with the passing of the New Zealand Nuclear Free Zone, Disarmament, and Arms Control Act 1987, more than two years after the Buchanan was refused entry after the US refused to declare the presence or absence of nuclear weapons, and a year after the US suspended its treaty obligations to New Zealand. This law effectively made the entire country a nuclear-free zone. Despite the ANZUS split, US Secretary of State George P. Shultz maintained that the ANZUS structure was still in place, should NZ decide in the future to reverse its anti-nuclear policy and return to a fully operational defence relationship with the US. President Reagan also maintained in NSDD 193 (National Security Decision Directive) that New Zealand still remained a "friend, but not an ally".

On 10 July 1985, agents of the French Directorate-General for External Security bombed the Greenpeace protest vessel Rainbow Warrior in Auckland, causing one death. The lack of condemnation by Western leaders to this violation of a friendly state's sovereignty caused a great deal of change in New Zealand's foreign and defence policy, and strengthened domestic opposition to the military application of nuclear technology in any form. New Zealand distanced itself from its traditional ally, the United States, and built relationships with small South Pacific countries, while retaining its good relations with Australia, and, to a lesser extent, the United Kingdom.

The suspension of New Zealand in ANZUS has had significant effect on New Zealand–United States relations and on New Zealand domestic policy. The anti-nuclear policy has been a part of New Zealand political culture for years now. However, that has not stopped United States politicians from trying to change the policy.

=== Afghanistan and Iraq ===
US President George W. Bush and Australian Prime Minister John Howard on 10 September 2001. Howard was in Washington during the 11 September attacks.

Australia and New Zealand both provided military units, including special forces and naval ships, in support of the US-led "Operation Enduring Freedom" for support for anti-Taliban forces in response to the 11 September 2001 terrorist attacks. Providing 1,550 troops, Australia was the largest non-NATO contributor of military personnel in Afghanistan. New Zealand committed 191 troops.

In response to the War in Afghanistan, New Zealand sent transport aircraft, maritime patrol aircraft, and frigates to the Persian Gulf, and sent a very small number of soldiers, SAS soldiers, medical and assorted and peace-keeping forces to Afghanistan in 2001.

Despite Prime Minister Helen Clark being openly critical of American justifications for the 2003 Iraq war, New Zealand sent engineer troops to Iraq following the 2003 invasion. These troops were however officially engaged in reconstruction under UN Security Council Resolution 1483 and were non-combatant.

=== East Timor ===
Between 1999 and 2003, the armed forces of Australia and New Zealand deployed together in a large scale operation in East Timor, to prevent pro-Indonesian militia from overturning a vote for independence on the region. The United States provided only limited logistical support but the USS Mobile Bay provided air defence for the initial entry operation. The operation was taken over by the United Nations.

=== Taiwan ===
One topic that became prominent in the 2000s was the implications in the case of a hypothetical attack by the People's Republic of China against Taiwan, who would likely receive American support. While Australia has strong cultural and economic ties with the United States, it also has an increasingly important trade relationship with mainland China.

In August 2004, Foreign Minister Alexander Downer implied in Beijing that the treaty would likely not apply to that situation, but he was quickly corrected by Prime Minister John Howard. In March 2005, after an official of the People's Republic of China stated that it may be necessary for Australia to reassess the treaty and after China passed an Anti-Secession Law regarding Taiwan, Downer stated that in case of Chinese aggression on Taiwan, the treaty would come into force, but that the treaty would require only consultations with the United States and not necessarily commit Australia to war.

=== 1985 to present ===
Annual bilateral meetings between the US Secretary of State and the Australian Foreign Minister replaced annual meetings of the ANZUS Council of Foreign Ministers. The first bilateral meeting was held in Canberra in 1985. At the second meeting, in San Francisco in 1986, the United States announced that it was suspending its treaty security obligations to New Zealand pending the restoration of port access. Subsequent bilateral Australia–US Ministerial (AUSMIN) meetings have alternated between Australia and the United States.

In 1996, under 22 U.S. Code § 2321k, United States president Bill Clinton, designated New Zealand as a major non-NATO ally, effectively recognizing New Zealand not only as a friend but also an ally.

The alliance engenders some political controversy in Australia. Particularly after Australian involvement in the 2003 Iraq war, some quarters of Australian society have called for a re-evaluation of the relationship between the two nations. Nonetheless, the alliance enjoyed broad support during the Cold War and continues to enjoy broad support in Australia. One commentator in Australia has argued that the treaty should be re-negotiated in the context of terrorism, the modern role of the United Nations and as a purely US–Australian alliance. Australia is also a contributor to the National Missile Defense system.

In May 2006, US assistant secretary of state for east asia and pacific affairs Christopher Hill described the New Zealand anti-nuclear issue as "a bit of a relic", and signalled that the US wanted a closer defence relationship with New Zealand. He also praised New Zealand's involvement in Afghanistan and reconstruction in Iraq. "Rather than trying to change each other's minds on the nuclear issue, which is a bit of a relic, I think we should focus on things we can make work" he told an Australian newspaper.

While there were signs of the nuclear dispute between the US and NZ thawing out, pressure from the United States increased in 2006 with US trade officials linking the repeal of the ban of American nuclear ships from New Zealand's ports to a potential free trade agreement between the two countries. On 4 February 2008, US trade representative Susan Schwab announced that the United States would join negotiations with four Asia–Pacific countries: Brunei, Chile, New Zealand and Singapore to be known as the "P-4". These countries already had a FTA called the Trans-Pacific Strategic Economic Partnership and the United States was looking to become involved in the "vitally important emerging Asia-Pacific region". A number of US-based organisations supported the negotiations including, but not limited to, the United States Chamber of Commerce, National Association of Manufacturers, National Foreign Trade Council, Emergency Committee for American Trade and Coalition of Service Industries.

In 2010, the United States and New Zealand signed the Wellington Declaration in Wellington, New Zealand, during a three-day visit by US secretary of state Hillary Clinton. The signing of the declaration ended the ANZUS dispute of the previous 25 years. It was later revealed the US and New Zealand had resumed military co-operation in eight areas in 2007.

On 16 November 2011, US president Obama and Australian prime minister Julia Gillard met in Canberra, Australia, to announce plans for a sustained new American presence on Australian soil. 2,500 American troops are to be deployed to Darwin, Australia.

New Zealand and the United States signed the Washington Declaration on 19 June 2012 "to promote and strengthen closer bilateral defense and security cooperation". On 20 September 2012, while on a visit to New Zealand, US secretary of defense Leon Panetta announced that the United States was lifting the 26-year-old ban on visits by New Zealand warships to US Department of Defense and US Coast Guard bases around the world; US Marines had trained in New Zealand and New Zealand's navy took part in the RIMPAC maritime exercises alongside the US earlier that year.

The Royal New Zealand Navy (RNZN) invited the United States Navy to send a vessel to participate in the RNZN's 75th Birthday Celebrations in Auckland over the weekend of 19–21 November 2016. The guided-missile destroyer USS Sampson became the first US warship to visit New Zealand in 33 years. New Zealand prime minister John Key granted approval for the ship's visit under the New Zealand Nuclear Free Zone, Disarmament, and Arms Control Act 1987, which requires that the Prime Minister has to be satisfied that any visiting ship is not nuclear armed or powered. Following the 7.8 magnitude Kaikōura earthquake on 14 November 2016 the Sampson and other naval ships from Australia, Canada, Japan and Singapore were diverted to proceed directly to Kaikōura to provide humanitarian assistance.

In late 2021 Australia, the UK and the USA signed the AUKUS agreement, a trilateral security partnership between Australia, the United Kingdom, and the United States. New Zealand did not participate and any nuclear submarines developed under the pact will be banned from New Zealand waters under their existing nuclear restrictions.

== See also ==
- Anglosphere
- ASEAN
- AUSCANNZUKUS
- Australian Defence Force
- Contents of the United States diplomatic cables leak (New Zealand)
- Five Eyes
- Five Power Defence Arrangements (FPDA) – Defence cooperation among Australia, Malaysia, New Zealand, Singapore and UK
- New Zealand Defence Force
- Pine Gap
- Quadrilateral Security Dialogue (QUAD) – Strategic dialogue among Australia, India, Japan and US
- Southeast Asia Treaty Organization (SEATO) – 1954–1977 international collective defense organisation
- United States Armed Forces
