= New Zealand Nuclear Free Zone, Disarmament, and Arms Control Act 1987 =

1987 law making New Zealand a nuclear-free zone

New Zealand Nuclear Free Zone, Disarmament, and Arms Control Act

New Zealand Parliament
- Long title: An Act to establish in New Zealand a Nuclear Free Zone, to promote and encourage an active and effective contribution by New Zealand to the essential process of disarmament and international arms control, and to implement in New Zealand the following treaties: (a) The South Pacific Nuclear Free Zone Treaty of 6 August 1985 (the text of which is set out in Schedule 1 to this Act): (b) The Treaty Banning Nuclear Weapon Tests in the Atmosphere, in Outer Space and Under Water of 5 August 1963 (the text of which is set out in Schedule 2 to this Act): (c) The Treaty on the Non-Proliferation of Nuclear Weapons of 1 July 1968 (the text of which is set out in Schedule 3 to this Act): (d) The Treaty on the Prohibition of the Emplacement of Nuclear Weapons and Other Weapons of Mass Destruction on the Sea-bed and the Ocean floor and in the Subsoil Thereof of 11 February 1971 (the text of which is set out in Schedule 4 to this Act): (e) The Convention on the Prohibition of the Development, Production and Stockpiling of Bacteriological (Biological) and Toxin Weapons and on their Destruction of 10 April 1972 (the text of which is set out in Schedule 5 to this Act)
- Royal assent: 8 June 1987

Legislative history
- Passed: 1987
- Status: Current legislation

In 1987, the Fourth Labour Government passed the New Zealand Nuclear Free Zone, Disarmament and Arms Control Act. The Act essentially declared New Zealand as a nuclear free zone. The purpose of the Act was ambitious and wide-ranging: “to establish in New Zealand a Nuclear Free Zone, to promote and encourage an active and effective contribution by New Zealand to the essential process of disarmament and international arms control”.

== Summary of the Act ==
The Act established the legal framework for New Zealand's anti-nuclear policy. The Act sets out the New Zealand Nuclear Free Zone consisting of all New Zealand territory (including ocean territory and airspace) and bans nuclear powered ships from entering into New Zealand waters. It also prohibits the acquisition, stationing and testing of nuclear explosive devices. Immunity from the law was granted to ships and aircraft exercising the right of innocent passage and/or the right of transit passage, as well as ships and aircraft in distress.

In addition to legislating for a national nuclear-free zone, the Act implemented four international treaties. These included the Treaty on the Non-Proliferation of Nuclear Weapons, the Seabed Arms Control Treaty, the Biological Weapons Convention and the Treaty of Rarotonga.

The Act established the Public Advisory Committee for Disarmament and Arms Control (PACDAC). PACDAC is a committee of nine experts that advise the Government on disarmament and arms control. The Act also created a separate ministerial portfolio of Arms Control and Disarmament.

== Background ==
Anti-nuclear public opinion played a huge role in setting the stage for this Act. In the years leading up to the Act, strong anti-nuclear opinions were mounting. Visits to New Zealand by United States navy ships caused publicity and protest. Anti-nuclear opinion was exacerbated with the sinking of the Greenpeace protest ship the Rainbow Warrior (1955) on 10 July 1985. Maire Leadbeater observed that New Zealand's nuclear free policy and the resulting legislation demonstrated “how ordinary people created a movement that changed New Zealand’s foreign policy and identity as a nation”.

The New Zealand Nuclear Free Zone, Disarmament, and Arms Control Act 1987 was the result of the New Zealand Labour Party’s victory in the 1984 election. On 12 June 1984, Richard Prebble introduced the Nuclear Free New Zealand Bill, which called for the exclusion of nuclear powered ships from New Zealand. New Zealand National Party MP Marilyn Waring threatened to cross the floor and vote for Prebble's anti-nuclear bill. This challenged Prime Minister Robert Muldoon's leadership, as the National Government had a majority of only one person in Parliament. Muldoon announced on 14 June 1984 that he would call a snap election. The question of nuclear ship visits became central to the 1984 election.

July 1984 saw the New Zealand Labour Party sweeping to power with their strong anti-nuclear policies. Many supporters of the Labour Government asserted that the party had been elected to make New Zealand nuclear free. They promised to declare New Zealand nuclear free and work actively for a nuclear weapons free zone in the South Pacific. This was a popular stand, and by the end of the year nearly 40 towns and boroughs had declared themselves nuclear free. In February 1985, the Lange Government rejected the arrival of the USS Buchanan ship. The Reagan Administration retaliated by taking punitive action against New Zealand. They restricted various types of intelligence sharing and reduced military ties with New Zealand. Despite this, the Lange government remained committed to their anti-nuclear policy. David Lange stated that if the security alliance was the price New Zealand must pay to remain nuclear-free, ‘it is the price we are prepared to pay’. In December 1985, The Labour Government's asserted New Zealand's independence and introduced the New Zealand Nuclear Free Zone, Disarmament, and Arms Control Act Bill.

== Significance of the Act ==
As Sir Geoffrey Palmer observed, the enactment of the New Zealand Nuclear Free Zone, Disarmament, and Arms Control Act 1987 was “a signal statement of New Zealand’s determination to stand up for a principle in which its people believe”. The significance of the Act lies in its affirmation that New Zealand exists as an independent and proud democracy concerned about the future of the planet. The Act has given New Zealand a significant voice in the international community.

== Developments ==
In 2000, the New Zealand Nuclear Free Zone Extension Bill was introduced into Parliament with the aim of extending the New Zealand nuclear free zone from 12 miles to 200 miles and to prohibit the transit of high level nuclear waste, nuclear weapons and nuclear powered ships through that extended zone. However, this was rejected by Parliament in the second reading stage.

In 2006, a survey was carried out of all political parties represented in New Zealand Parliament asking for their positions on the Act. The findings showed near universal support for the Act. The National Party pledged it will retain the legislation unchanged should it become the government.

The Act received the 2013 Silver Award of the World Future Council’s annual future policy Award, in partnership with the United Nations Office for Disarmament Affairs and the Inter-Parliamentary Union. The Act was recognised as being a leader amongst peace and disarmament initiatives and for having fundamentally changed New Zealand's culture, role and identity on the world stage.

== See also ==
- ANZUS § New Zealand bans nuclear material
- Foreign policy of the Ronald Reagan administration § New Zealand
- Contents of the United States diplomatic cables leak (New Zealand)
- Japan's non-nuclear weapons policy
