= Angela Kane =

German diplomat (born 1948)

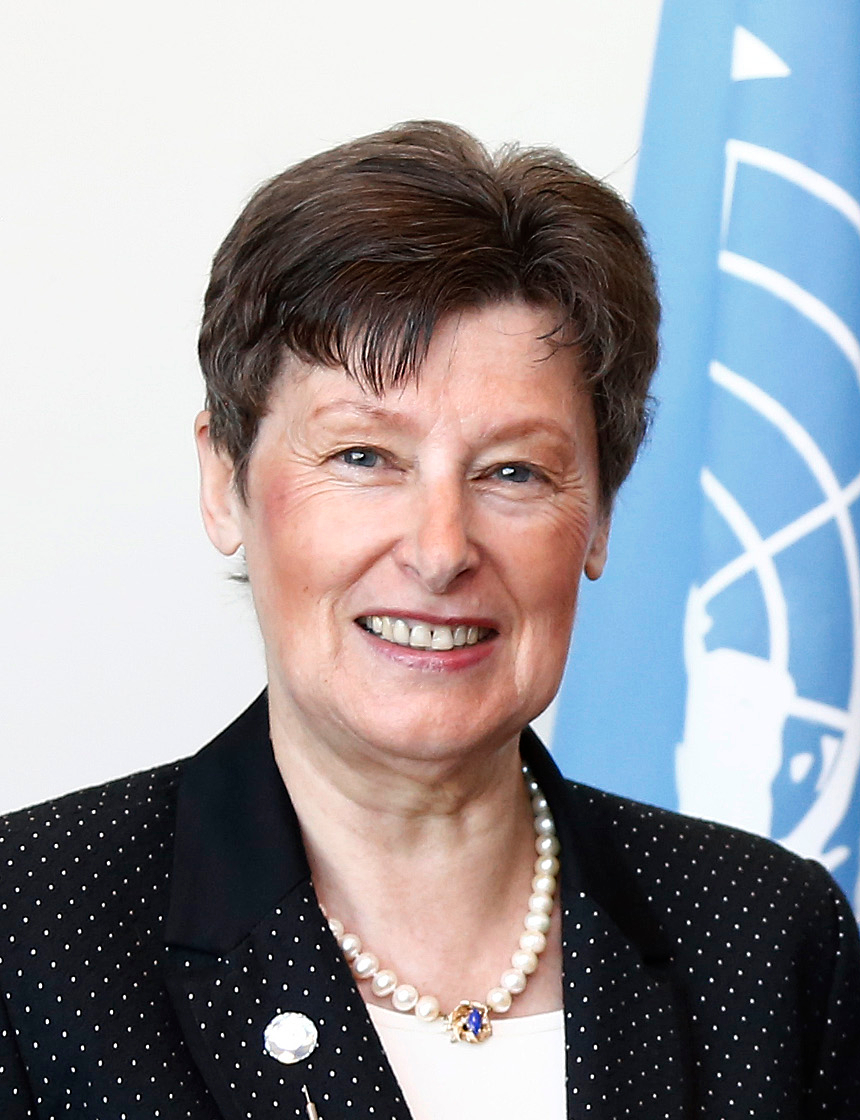
- Kane in 2015

United Nations High Representative for Disarmament Affairs
- In office 8 March 2012 – 2015
- Preceded by: Sergio de Queiroz Duarte
- Succeeded by: Kim Won-soo

Under-Secretary-General of the United Nations for Management
- In office May 2008 – 2012

Assistant Secretary-General for Political Affairs
- In office 2006 – 2008

Personal details
- Born: September 29, 1948 (age 78) Hamelin, Lower Saxony, Allied-occupied Germany
- Education: Bryn Mawr College; Johns Hopkins University
- Awards: Order of Merit of the Federal Republic of Germany (2015); Dag Hammarskjöld Medal (2016)

Angela Kane (born September 29, 1948) is a German diplomat and was formerly the UN High Representative for Disarmament Affairs and Under-Secretary-General for Management in the United Nations.

== Education and career ==
Kane was born in Hamelin, Lower Saxony, Germany and attended LMU Munich. She holds degrees from Bryn Mawr College and the Johns Hopkins School of Advanced International Studies. She was awarded an honorary doctorate from the Middlebury Institute of International Studies in Monterey, California.

Before she joined the UN Secretariat in 1977, Kane worked for the World Bank in Washington, D.C. and in the private sector in Europe.

=== UN career ===
From 1995 to 1999, Kane held a managerial position in the Department of Public Information, where she was responsible for United Nations publications and the Dag Hammarskjöld Library. In this capacity, she launched the UN website in all official UN languages and administered the putting in place of the online documentation system through the UN website.

She held a number of senior positions at the United Nations, including Principal Officer for Political Affairs in the Office of former Secretary-General Boutros Boutros-Ghali and as political adviser to the Personal Representative of the Secretary-General for the Central American Peace Process to end the conflict in El Salvador. Additionally, she has worked in several UN missions including as Deputy Special Representative of the Secretary-General United Nations Mission in Ethiopia and Eritrea (UNMEE), in the Democratic Republic of the Congo, and had postings in Jakarta and Bangkok. She served as Assistant Secretary-General for General Assembly and Conference Management, where she concentrated on the implementation of reform initiatives, integrated global management, the use of information technology tools and the re-positioning of the department as a proactive and efficient service provider.

She served twice in the Department of Political Affairs, as Assistant Secretary-General and previously as Director, focusing on preventing and resolving conflicts. In the latter capacity, she was in charge of the divisions dealing with the Americas, Asia and the Pacific, Europe and the Middle East, as well as decolonization, and the division for Palestinian rights. As Assistant Secretary-General, she supported several special political missions in Iraq, Nepal and the Middle East, and established the International Commission against Impunity in Guatemala, which was unprecedented among UN or other international efforts to promote accountability and strengthen the rule of law. Between May 2008 and 2012, she was Under-Secretary-General for Management, responsible for an $11 billion annual budget, plus $2 billion for the renovation of the New York campus, overseeing the management of over 50,000 staff worldwide.

==== Disarmament and later roles ====
She was named as new UN High Representative for Disarmament Affairs on 8 March 2012, replacing Sergio de Queiroz Duarte. She was responsible for negotiating and conducting the chemical weapons investigation in Syria in 2013 which led to Syria joining the Chemical Weapons Convention and the dismantlement of its declared chemical weapons stocks.

== Later life ==
As of 2016, Kane teaches at Sciences Po Paris School of International Affairs on disarmament issues. Since 2019, Kane has also been teaching Leading in International Organizations at Tsinghua University Schwarzman College as part of the Schwarzman Scholars program. She is a Senior Fellow at the Vienna Center for Disarmament and Non-Proliferation. and the Vice President of the International Institute for Peace in Vienna In 2015, she received the Order of Merit of the Federal Republic of Germany (Grosses Verdienstkreuz). In 2016 she also received the Grand Decoration of Honour in Gold with Star High Award from the Ministry of Foreign Affairs of Austria. Also in 2016, Kane received the Dag Hammarskjöld Medal from then Foreign Minister Steinmeier.

In April 2016, Kane was appointed by United Nations Secretary-General Ban Ki-moon and Director-General Irina Bokova of the United Nations Educational Scientific and Cultural Organization (UNESCO) to the governing council of the United Nations University. In 2019, she was appointed Chair of the UNU Council.

In August 2021, Kane assumed the position of Sam Nunn Distinguished Fellow at the Nuclear Threat Initiative (NTI), supporting NTI's work on global threat reduction.

In addition, Kane holds various positions, including the following:

- Co-chair of the Regional Future Council on the Korean Peninsula, World Economic Forum (WEF)
- Member, Group of Eminent Persons for Substantive Advancement of Nuclear Disarmament, Ministry of Foreign Affairs of Japan
- Senior Member, European Leadership Network
- Member, Group of Eminent Persons (GEM), Preparatory Commission for the Comprehensive Nuclear-Test-Ban Treaty (CTBTO)
- Chair, Board of Directors, Dialogue Advisory Group (DAG)
- Vorstandsmitglied, Österreichische Gesellschaft für Aussenpolitik und die Vereinten Nationen (OEGVN)
- Senior Fellow, Vienna Center for Disarmament and Nonproliferation (VCDNP)
- Vice President, International Institute for Peace (IIP)
- Member of the advisory board, Security Council Report
- Member, Board of Directors, Arms Control Association
- Member of the International Board, Bonn International Center for Conversion (BICC)
- Member of the Strategic Committee, Paris School of International Affairs (PSIA)
- Advisory Fellow, Foreign Policy Association

== Personal life ==
Angela Kane was married to the Dutch diplomat Herman Knippenberg, who was attached to the Dutch embassy in Bangkok in the mid-seventies at the time when the French serial killer Charles Sobhraj was on his killing spree in Thailand and Nepal. The couple were the first to investigate Sobhraj's crimes, eventually building up a substantial body of knowledge which was handed over to Interpol and which played a critical role in the subsequent arrest and conviction of Sobhraj and his partner Marie-Andrée Leclerc. Kane was portrayed by the actress Ellie Bamber in the BBC serial on Sobhraj titled The Serpent which was broadcast in January 2021. Kane has stated that she was displeased by the diminution of her role in cracking the case, as portrayed in the series.
