= The Serpent (TV series) =

British crime drama series

- Genre: Crime drama
- Written by: Richard Warlow; Toby Finlay
- Directed by: Tom Shankland; Hans Herbots
- Starring: Tahar Rahim; Jenna Coleman; Billy Howle; Ellie Bamber; Amesh Edireweera; Tim McInnerny; Dasha Nekrasova; Mathilde Warnier
- Composer: Dominik Scherrer
- Country of origin: United Kingdom
- Original languages: English; French; Dutch; Thai
- No. of series: 1
- No. of episodes: 8

Production
- Executive producers: Richard Warlow; Tom Shankland; Preethi Mavahalli; Damien Timmer; Lucy Richer
- Production locations: India; United Kingdom; Thailand
- Production companies: Mammoth Screen; Living Films

Original release
- Network: BBC One
- Release: 1 January – 14 February 2021

The Serpent is a 2021 British crime drama television serial developed by Mammoth Screen and commissioned by the BBC. The eight-part series is a co-production between BBC One and Netflix. It is based on the crimes of French serial killer Charles "the Serpent" Sobhraj, who murdered young backpackers on the "hippie trail" from 1975 to 1976. The series stars Tahar Rahim in the lead role as Sobhraj.

The series was shot on location in Thailand, until the COVID-19 pandemic which halted production for five months from March 2020. Filming was completed in Hertfordshire, England, during August 2020. It premiered on BBC One on New Year's Day in 2021 and all eight episodes were immediately made available on BBC iPlayer. The show began streaming on Netflix in April 2021.

== Plot ==
Set in the mid-1970s, the story follows Charles Sobhraj, a French serial killer of Indian and Vietnamese descent, as he drugs and robs travellers, particularly young backpackers, travelling through Bangkok, Thailand, along the overland. He steals his victims' passports and identities to travel the world and sells stolen gems with girlfriend Marie-Andrée Leclerc. Charles Sobhraj is at the height of his crimes when a Dutch diplomat, Herman Knippenberg, begins investigating the murders of Dutch tourists and uncovers clues leading to Sobhraj.

== Cast ==
- Tahar Rahim as Charles Sobhraj
- Jenna Coleman as Marie-Andrée Leclerc
- Billy Howle as Herman Knippenberg
- Ellie Bamber as Angela Knippenberg (later Angela Kane)
- Amesh Edireweera as Ajay Chowdhury
- Tim McInnerny as Paul Siemons
- Chicha Amatayakul as Suda Romyen
- Sahajak Boonthanakit as Major General Janthisan
- İlker Kaleli as Vitali Hakim
- Adam Rothenberg as Gilbert Redland
- Mathilde Warnier as Nadine Gires
- Supadej "Kenneth" Wongwatanaphan as Yotin
- Ellie de Lange as Helena Dekker
- James Gerard as Jules Dupont
- Apasiri Kulthanan as Lawana
- William Brand as Ambassador van Dongen
- Chotika Sintuboonkul as Kannika
- Ryan O'Donnell as Greg Raynott
- Libby Jennings as Viola Raynott
- Raphael Roger Levy as Count Michel-Andre Jurion
- Fabien Frankel as Dominique Renelleau
- Stacy Martin as Juliette Voclain
- Alice Englert as Teresa Knowlton
- Tim McMullan as Douglas Cartwright
- Nicole Beutler as Dagmar Boeder
- Johan Van Assche as Otto Boeder
- Surasak "Noo" Chaiyaat as Romyen
- Grégoire Isvarine as Remi Gires
- Ruby Ashbourne Serkis as Celia Austin
- Armand Rosbak as Willem Bloem
- Deepika Parajuli as Live Goddess "Kumari", Nepal
- Dasha Nekrasova as Connie-Jo Bronzich
- Thomas Ryckewaert as Jean Huygens
- Alyy Khan as Naranda Nath Tully
- Teerapat Sajakul as Interpol Lieutenant Colonel Sompol Suthimai
- Pravesh Rana as Thapa, the Nepali police officer
- Darshan Jariwala as hotel manager

== Episodes ==
No.	Title	Directed by	Written by	Original release date	U.K. viewers (millions)
1	"Episode One"	Tom Shankland	Richard Warlow	1 January 2021	8.70
Bangkok, 1975. Herman Knippenberg, a Dutch diplomat in Bangkok, investigates the disappearance of a young couple who were last seen alive at the apartment of gem dealer Charles Sobhraj.
2	"Episode Two"	Tom Shankland	Richard Warlow	3 January 2021	7.37
Marie-Andrée Leclerc leaves her life behind for the love of Charles Sobhraj but discovers the chilling cost. Herman Knippenberg vows to investigate the murders of the Dutch couple Willem Bloem and his fiancée Helena Dekker.
3	"Episode Three"	Tom Shankland	Richard Warlow	10 January 2021	6.83
Young Frenchman Dominique Renelleau tries to escape Charles Sobhraj's terrifying lair. As he listens to Nadine and Remi's testimony, Herman realises the scale of Charles's crimes.
4	"Episode Four"	Tom Shankland	Richard Warlow	17 January 2021	6.73
Charles embarks on a terrifying trail of destruction in Nepal, while Nadine helps Herman gather the final evidence he needs for the police to act.
5	"Episode Five"	Hans Herbots	Toby Finlay	24 January 2021	6.89
Herman with the help of Nadine begin an exhausting cat and mouse game with Charles. Despite Herman providing substantial evidence to the Thai Police, he continues to pile on the pressure on Major General Janthasin to prosecute Charles, Marie and Ajay. Unfortunately, the suspects are one step ahead.
6	"Episode Six"	Hans Herbots	Toby Finlay	31 January 2021	7.07
The fallout from Charles Sobhraj's (aka Alain Gautier) escape threatens Herman's diplomatic career. Charles attempts to set up business in France, a place that holds powerful memories for him.
7	"Episode Seven"	Hans Herbots	Toby Finlay & Richard Warlow	7 February 2021	7.14
Charles and Marie-Andrée arrive in Paris and try to set up a new life. Charles takes Marie-Andrée to meet his mother, however their meeting is not amicable. In Bangkok, Herman makes a breakthrough as news of Charles's crimes makes the headlines in the Bangkok Post and receives the attention of Interpol in Thailand. Meanwhile, Charles visits his ex-wife to make amends as Marie-Andrée returns to visit Charles's mother alone to obtain some answers.
8	"Episode Eight"	Hans Herbots	Richard Warlow	14 February 2021	6.27
After an international arrest warrant is issued by Interpol at the request of the Thai police, the net begins to close in on Charles and Marie-Andrée in India. However, the final chapter of Herman's pursuit of Charles Sobhraj stretches long into the future.

== Production ==
=== Development and casting ===
In July 2019, the BBC announced that it had commissioned the eight-part drama from Mammoth Screen, Tom Shankland, and Richard Warlow. Tahar Rahim would star as Charles Sobhraj.

Jenna Coleman, Billy Howle, and Ellie Bamber joined the main cast in September 2019. Warlow and Toby Finlay would write, Shankland and Hans Herbots would direct, and Warlow and Shankland would executive produce alongside Stephen Smallwood, Preethi Mavahalli, Damien Timmer, and Lucy Richer.

To understand her character better, Coleman read Leclerc's diaries, which covered the period of the murders and before.

=== Filming ===
The Serpent was filmed in Thailand across nine provinces, although principal photography took place in the capital Bangkok and in the resort town of Hua Hin in Thailand's Prachuap Khiri Khan province. Shooting lasted about 10 months, with the production team working with local production house Living Films. Filming stopped in late March 2020 due to the COVID-19 pandemic, but resumed in Hertfordshire, England in August 2020 after five months. Scenes shot upon the resumption of filming were seamlessly blended among existing shots from Thailand, with just minor changes to the script required. According to Jenna Coleman, in multiple TV and radio interviews, scenes taking place in India and France (among other locations) were shot in England due to the production being prevented from filming on location. Later, the BBC Writers Room made the shooting scripts for the episodes available through its online script library; the scripts indicate which scenes needed to be shot in England.

== Release ==
BBC One revealed first look stills of the series in January 2020. A trailer was then released on 17 December 2020. The drama debuted on BBC One on 1 January 2021, followed by Episode 2 a few days later, after which the series settled into a weekly broadcast on Sunday nights. The complete 8-episode series was also released on iPlayer also on 1 January. Both the BBC broadcast and streaming release were available to UK residents only. In early February, the UK version of Amazon began listing a DVD release of the series, available as of 22 February 2021; as of June 2023 no permanent physical release has occurred in North America.

Netflix streamed the series internationally in April 2021.

== Reception ==
On Rotten Tomatoes, the series holds an approval rating of 70% based on 33 critic reviews, with an average rating of 6.4/10. The website's critical consensus reads, "Tahar Rahim's unnerving performance brings reptilian menace to The Serpent, but this uneven slice of true crime is too byzantine in structure and too pat about its central villain's motivations to really get under the skin."

The Serpent received generally positive reviews in the UK. Rebecca Nicholson, writing in The Guardian, gave the first episode 3/5 stars, finding the time-hopping plotting unnecessary and confusing, and wondering whether the programme had much to say, while admiring the atmosphere and the 'routinely outstanding cast'. For Euan Ferguson writing in The Observer, who admired Rahim and Coleman's acting, The Serpent was a 'skilful retelling' of the Sobhraj story and one that both pays homage to his victims, while revealing the cultural shortcomings of the flower children. That Rahim underplays Sobhraj's charm was a good thing for Ferguson. However, Rahim's absence of charisma makes it hard to understand how Sobhraj gained a hold over people for Flora Carr, writing in The Radio Times, who gives the show 3/5 stars.

Giving the programme 3/5 stars, Ed Cumming in The Independent found the pace slow and Rahim's acting staying mostly on the right side of the fine line between inscrutable and dull. James Delingpole in The Spectator called it "the best BBC drama series in ages", admiring the period detail, superb casting and absence of "unnecessary politics" as well as noting that it might be especially painful for people who could have found themselves in similar scenarios to those that Charles Sobhraj exploited. By mid-point The Serpent gathers "considerable momentum" according to Trevor Johnson in Sight and Sound reviewing the first four episodes, who goes on to write that the series features an "alluring anti-hero" and excellent score, but is let down by the shallow characterisation of its Thai characters. Rahul Desai of Film Companion called The Serpent “a refreshing restoration of balance" adding that it "reduces Charles Sobhraj from an image to an individual, a portrait to a person – and most importantly, from a human to a reptile."

Angela Kane (formerly Knippenberg) has said that she was unhappy that The Serpent had downplayed her role in cracking the case. The journalist Andrew Anthony, who interviewed Sobhraj twice, said that while the series captured his "enigmatic detachment and quiet menace", it misses his more troubling qualities of wit, charm and "a kind of playful sense of self-mythologising".

In the Netherlands, one publication noted the inability of Billy Howle, playing a Dutchman, to pronounce his Dutch lines accurately.

In Québec and France, it was noted that Jenna Coleman struggled to speak Canadian French accurately.

== Trivia ==
Charles Sobhraj was actually arrested by Police inspector Zende in Goa. Zende spotted him sitting in a restaurant and apprehended him.

The series does not show this or give due mention to Indian police inspector even in final credits.
