= High Representative (disambiguation) =

High Representative may refer to either:

- The High Representative of the Union for Foreign Affairs and Security Policy, the head of European Union foreign policy
- The High Representative for Bosnia and Herzegovina, the United Nations delegate charged with overseeing the implementation of the Dayton Agreement in Bosnia and Herzegovina
- A proposed US appointed administrator for Afghanistan
- High Representative for the United Nations Alliance of Civilizations
- High Representative for Disarmament Affairs

See also:

- High Commissioner
- Special Representative
