= Izumi Nakamitsu =

Japanese diplomat and United Nations official

- 中満 泉
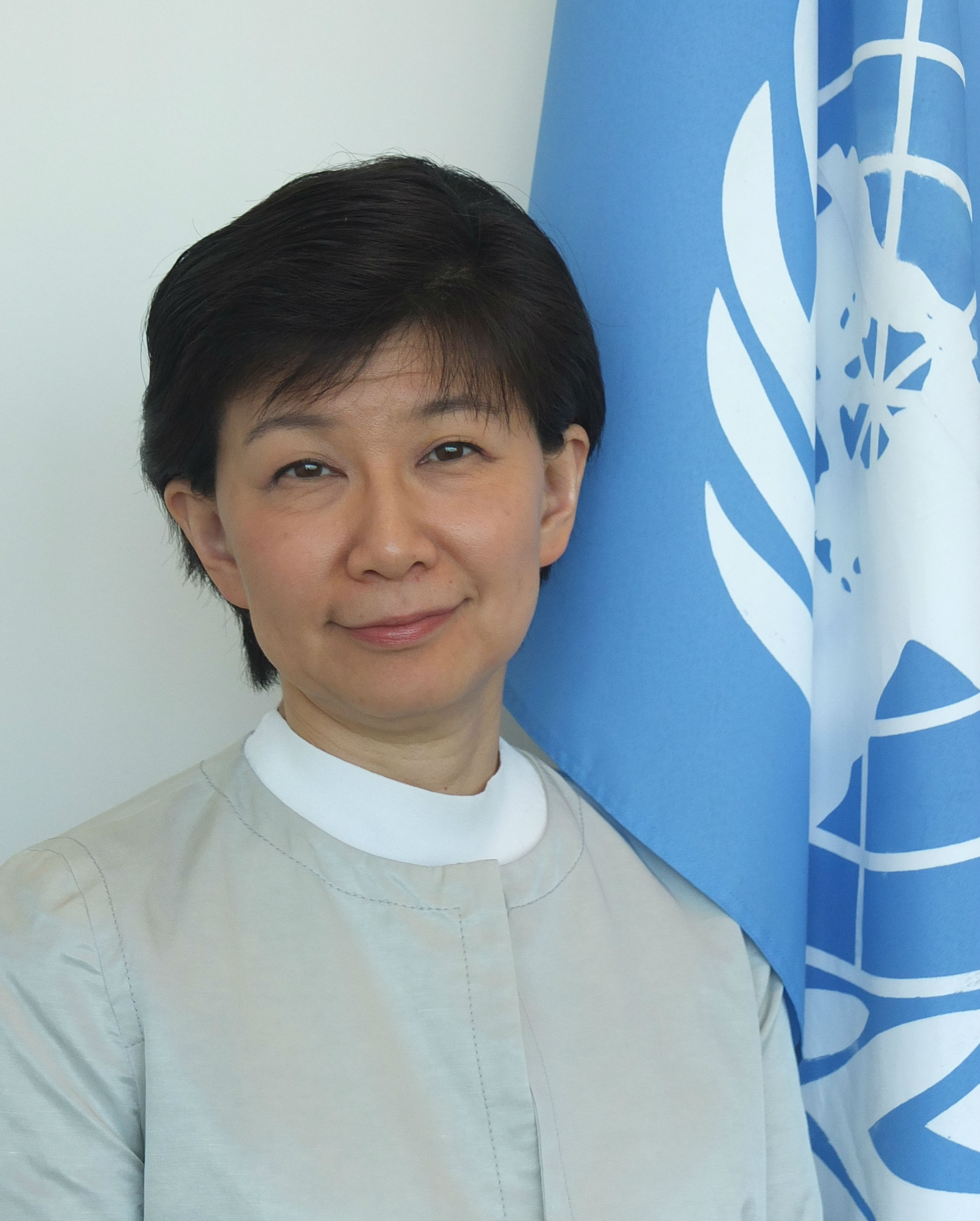
- Nakamitsu in 2017

United Nations High Representative for Disarmament Affairs
- Incumbent
- Assumed office 29 March 2017
- Appointed by: António Guterres
- Preceded by: Kim Won-soo

United Nations Assistant Secretary-General
- In office June 2014 – June 2018
- Appointed by: Ban Ki-moon
- Succeeded by: Asako Okai

United Nations Development Programme Assistant Administrator of the Crisis Response Unit
- In office June 2014 – June 2018
- Appointed by: Ban Ki-moon
- Succeeded by: Asako Okai

Personal details
- Born: 1963 Tokyo, Japan
- Spouse: Magnus Lennartsson
- Education: Waseda University (LLB); Georgetown University (MS)

Izumi Nakamitsu (中満 泉 Nakamitsu Izumi; born 1963) is a United Nations Under-Secretary-General of Disarmament Affairs from March 29, 2017, appointed by United Nations Secretary-General António Guterres. She succeeded Kim Won-soo of the Republic of Korea. Prior to this, she served as the Assistant Secretary-General, Assistant Administrator, and Crisis Response Unit leader of the United Nations Development Programme.

Nakamitsu began her career with the United Nations in 2008, and during that time has held several high-level positions with the Organization. From 2016 to 2017, she was the Special Adviser Ad Interim on Follow-up to the Summit on Addressing Large Movements of Refugees and Migrants. Previous to this, she held the position of Director in the Department of Peacekeeping Operations.

Nakamitsu is married to Magnus Lennartsson, a Swedish diplomat serving as Deputy Permanent Representative for the Swedish Mission to the United Nations in New York, and former Deputy chief of mission for the Embassy of Sweden, Tokyo. They have 2 daughters.

== Education ==
Nakamitsu holds a Bachelor of Laws from Waseda University and a Master of Science in Foreign Service from Georgetown University.

== Career ==
Nakamitsu, a Japanese national, has had a distinguished career and has held positions both within and outside the United Nations.

- Before 1998: held positions with the United Nations at both headquarters and on the field (UN Reform Team of former Secretary-General Kofi Annan, office of UNHCR Assistant High Commissioner for Policy and operations, and UNHCR field operations in (former) Yugoslavia, Turkey, and northern Iraq.
- 1998-2004: Chef de Cabinet and Director of Planning and Coordination at International Institute for Democracy and Electoral Assistance (international IDEA) in Stockholm.
- 2005-2008: She taught International Relations at Hitotsubashi University in Tokyo while also serving as an advisor to the Japanese Foreign Minister and at the Japan International Cooperation Agency
- 2008-2012: She held the position of Director in the United Nations Department of Peacekeeping Operations

In addition to her role as Assistant Secretary-General, United Nations Secretary-General Ban Ki-moon also appointed her as Special Adviser ad interim on Follow-up to the Summit on Addressing Large Movements of Refugees and Migrants in 2016; in this capacity, Nakamitsu succeeded Karen AbuZayd.

In March 2017, Nakamitsu was appointed as the next Under-Secretary-General and High Representative for Disarmament Affairs, Office for Disarmament Affairs.

== Other activities ==
Nakamitsu is a member of the International Gender Champions (IGC) network, which advocates for gender equality, including in international organizations.
