= Tegegnework Gettu =

United Nations Under-Secretary-General for General Assembly and Conference Management
- In office 2013–2015
- Succeeded by: Catherine Pollard

Personal details
- Born: 1952 (age 72–73)

Tegegnework Gettu is the United Nations Under-Secretary-General and Associate Administrator of the United Nations Development Programme (UNDP) replacing María Eugenia Casar. He previously held the post of Under-Secretary-General for General Assembly and Conference Management. He was appointed to this position by the United Nations Secretary-General Ban Ki-moon on 25 March 2013.

== Academic career ==
Tegegnework Gettu has lectured in a number of academic institutions, including Addis Ababa University, Hunter College, and the University of Rochester, New York. He was also a Fellow at Columbia University.

== International career ==
Tegegnework Gettu served a number of high-ranking positions in the United Nations Development Programme, both at the country level and at its headquarters in New York. He was the Country Director for Southern Africa and Indian Ocean countries and Acting Resident Representative in Liberia and Sierra Leone before becoming a Senior Economic and Political Advisor in UNDP's Africa Bureau. He later served as Assistant Secretary-General and Regional Bureau Director for Africa at UNDP.

== Personal life ==
An Ethiopian national, Tegegnework Gettu was born in 1952. He is married and has two children.
