= Asako Okai =

Japanese diplomat

- 岡井朝子 おかい あさこ
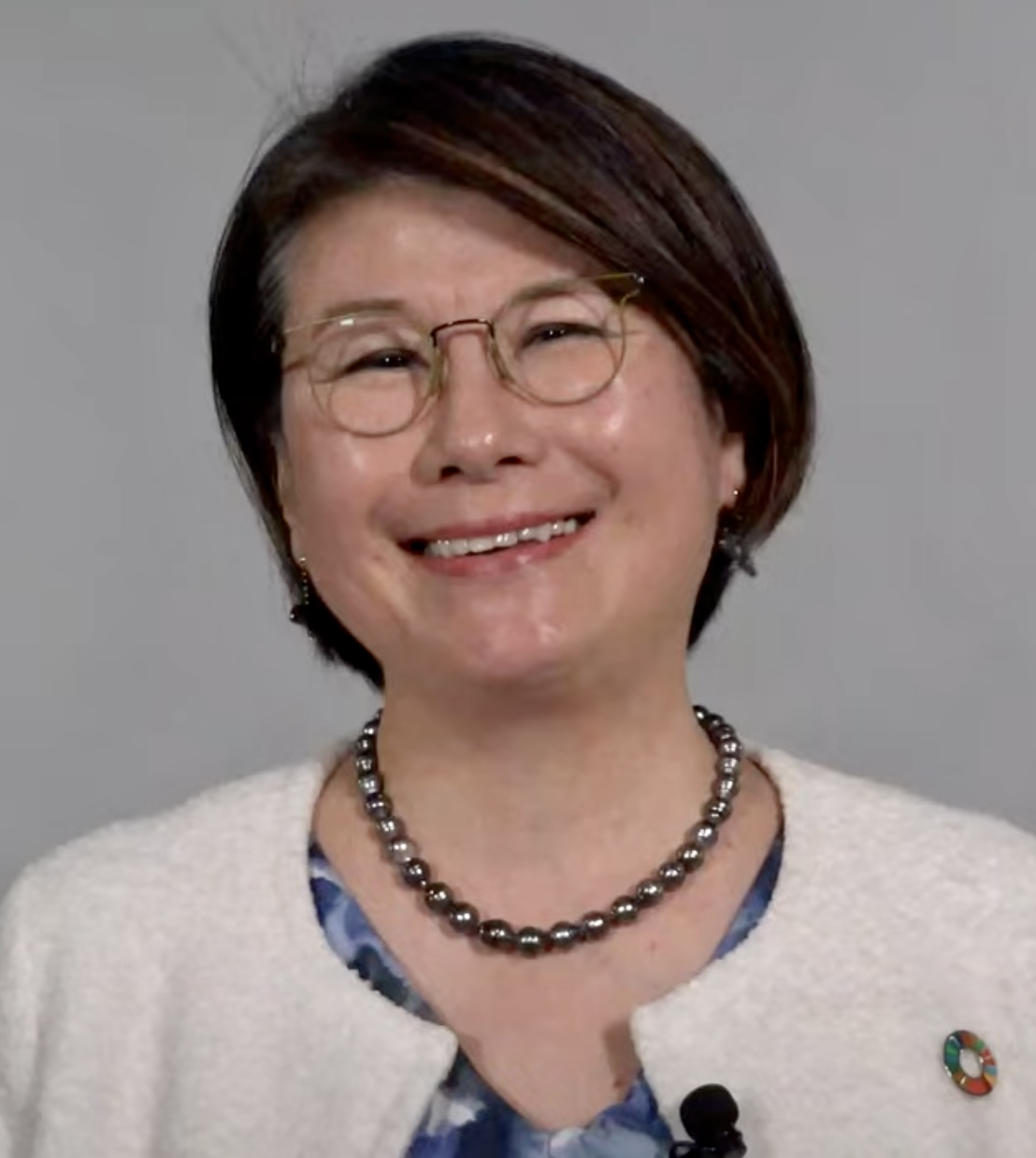

United Nations Assistant Secretary-General
- Incumbent
- Assumed office June 6, 2018
- Appointed by: António Guterres
- Preceded by: Izumi Nakamitsu

United Nations Development Programme Assistant Administrator and Director for Crisis Bureau
- Incumbent
- Assumed office June 6, 2018
- Appointed by: António Guterres
- Preceded by: Izumi Nakamitsu

Consul General of Japan in Canada
- In office September 2016 – June 2018
- Appointed by: Fumio Kishida
- Preceded by: Seiji Okada
- Succeeded by: Takashi Hatori

Personal details
- Born: 1966; 60 years ago Tokyo
- Citizenship: (Japan) Japanese
- Education: Hitotsubashi University; Emmanuel College of Cambridge University

Asako Okai is a Japanese diplomat and UN official currently serving as the ambassador of Japan in Bahrain. She started her career at the UN as assistant administrator at the United Nations Development Programme (UNDP), and director for the UNDP Crisis Bureau, and became United Nations Assistant Secretary-General in 2018. During her time at the USDP, she was in charge of the UNDP’s corporate crisis-related work.

== Personal life ==
Asako Okai was born in Tokyo, Japan in 1966. Her father was a reporter for the Nihon Keizai Shimbun, a Japanese newspaper. She attended school in Washington, DC from the fifth grade until the 11th grade when she returned to Japan.

She is married.

== Education ==
Okai completed her secondary education at Tokyo Gakugei University High School. In 1989, she graduated from Hitotsubashi University with a bachelor’s degree in law. At Hitotsubashi, she was a member the Yasuo Sugihara seminar group. In 1992, Okai completed a master’s of arts in art history at Emmanuel College, Cambridge University.

== Career ==
=== Japan government ===
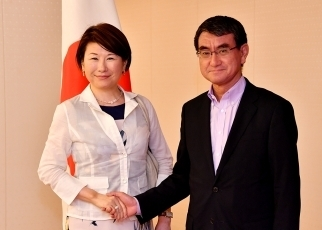
Asako Okai and Taro Kono on July 27, 2018

Asako Okai entered the Ministry of Foreign Affairs and held various positions throughout her career. She worked in divisions related to culture, economic cooperation, policy planning, and international cooperation. Some notable positions included deputy director of the Western Europe Division, First Secretary at the Embassy of Japan in Pakistan deputy director of Australia Division, Director of the Policy Division in the Economic Cooperation Bureau, and Director of the Humanitarian Assistance Division.

In 2010, she served as Minister Counselor (Political Affairs) at the Permanent Mission of Japan to the United Nations and was a Senior Policy Coordinator in the Office of the President of the 66th Session of the United Nations General Assembly in 2011. In 2012, she continued her role as Minister Counselor (Political Affairs) at the Permanent Mission of Japan to the United Nations.

In 2014, Okai became the Deputy Chief of Mission at the Embassy of Japan in Sri Lanka and concurrently served in the Maldives. In 2016, she became the first female Consul General of Japan in Canada, holding the position in Vancouver.

=== United Nations ===
Asako Okai interview with United States Institute of Peace

In 2018, she served as Minister at the Permanent Mission of Japan to the United Nations. Later, she took on roles as Assistant Secretary-General of the United Nations, Assistant Administrator and Deputy Director-General of the United Nations Development Programme.

Okai also served as the second director of the Crisis Response Bureau of UNDP(former Crisis Response Unit), where she played a role in formulating cooperation plans with other agencies.
