= Nicolas Michel =

Swiss lawyer (born 1949)

Nicolas Michel (born 7 November 1949) is a Swiss lawyer who serves as an adjunct professor of international law at the Geneva Graduate Institute of International and Development Studies.

== Early life and education ==
Michel obtained his PhD in law from the University of Fribourg and his Master of Arts in international relations from Georgetown University in Washington D.C. He has authored numerous books and articles on international and European law.

== Career ==
From 1987 to 1998, Michel taught as professor of international law and European law at the University of Fribourg in Switzerland.

Michel subsequently served as the Legal Adviser of Switzerland's Federal Department of Foreign Affairs, where he also acted as the Director of the International Law Directorate from 1998 to 2003. In this capacity, he headed the Swiss delegation in such international conferences as the Preparatory Commission for the International Criminal Court and the Assembly of States Parties to the Rome Statute and in presenting national reports before international committees on racial discrimination, rights of the child, and minorities.

Michel served as Chairman of the Committee of the Legal Advisor on Public International Law of the Council of Europe (CAHDI) and as Chairman of several other international committees and meetings, including the Chairman of the Workshop on Article 51 of the United Nations Charter in Light of Future Threats to International Peace and Security in Geneva in March, 2004. Previously, he served, inter alia, as the Chairman of the Drafting Committee of the International Conference on "The Missing" in Geneva in 2003 and the Consultation and Preparatory Meeting on a Third Protocol to the Geneva Conventions in 2000.

Prior to his appointment at the Graduate Institute, Michel was Under-Secretary-General of the United Nations for Legal Affairs and United Nations Legal Counsel, overseeing the United Nations Office of Legal Affairs. In that role he was closely involved in setting up the Special Tribunal for Lebanon.

Ahead of the Vienna peace talks for Syria in 2015, Michel was appointed by United Nations Secretary-General Ban Ki-moon to head the working group on political and legal issues, in this capacity supporting United Nations Special Envoy for Syria Staffan de Mistura.

Michell is a member of the Crimes Against Humanity Initiative Advisory Council, a project of the Whitney R. Harris World Law Institute at Washington University School of Law in St. Louis to establish the world's first treaty on the prevention and punishment of crimes against humanity.

== Lectures ==
- Justice pénale internationale: progrès et défis in the Lecture Series of the United Nations Audiovisual Library of International Law
