= United Nations Regional Centre for Peace and Disarmament in Asia and the Pacific =

United Nations regional office in Nepal

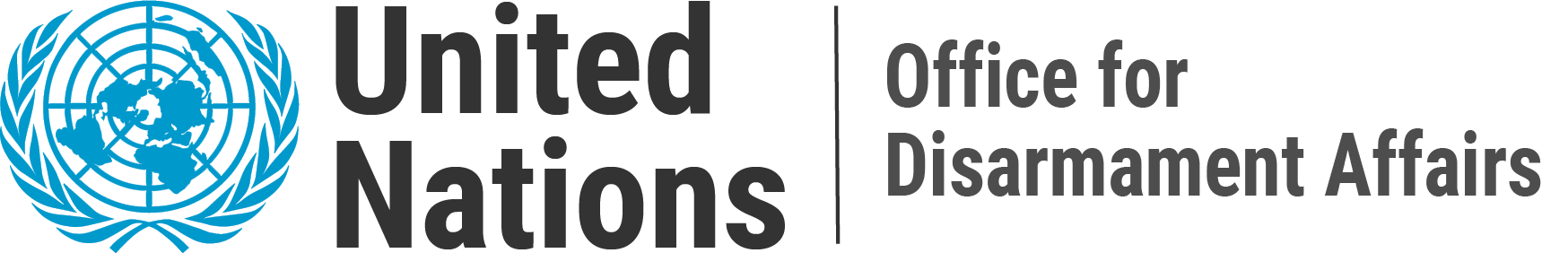
- Abbreviation: UNRCPD
- Established: 30 November 1987; 38 years ago
- Founder: United Nations General Assembly
- Type: Regional centre of the United Nations Office for Disarmament Affairs
- Purpose: Disarmament, non-proliferation, peacekeeping
- Headquarters: Kathmandu, Nepal
- Coordinates: 27.6675659°N 85.3215598°E
- Region served: Asia-Pacific
- Methods: Multilateral discussions and educational initiatives
- Director: Deepayan Basu Ray
- Parent organization: UNODA
- Website: www.unrcpd.org

The United Nations Regional Centre for Peace and Disarmament in Asia and the Pacific (UNRCPD) is a regional office of the United Nations Office for Disarmament Affairs located in Kathmandu, Nepal. It is dedicated to supporting member states in the Asia-Pacific region on issues of disarmament, arms control, non-proliferation, and related capacity-building efforts. It assists countries in promoting peace and security by focusing on regional and sub-regional cooperation.

== History ==
Resolution adopted at the 42nd session of the UN General Assembly which established the United Nations Regional Centre for Peace and Disarmament in Asia, which later became known as the United Nations Regional Centre for Peace and Disarmament in Asia and the Pacific (UNRCPD).

UNRCPD was established through UN General Assembly resolution A/42/39D, dated 30 November 1987, to provide substantive support, on request, for initiatives in the Asia-Pacific region aimed at implementing measures for peace and disarmament. The Centre became operational in 1989 and was relocated from New York to Kathmandu in August 2008.

== Mandate and functions ==
UNRCPD's mandate, as defined in the founding resolution, is to provide, on request and by agreement with member states of the Asia-Pacific region, substantive support for initiatives aimed at the implementation of measures for peace and disarmament, and to coordinate the implementation of regional activities in Asia and the Pacific.

Its principal functions include:

- Providing capacity-building, technical and legal assistance to states in the region.
- Supporting dialogue and confidence-building among states in the region.
- Engaging in outreach, advocacy and education to raise awareness of disarmament, peace and security issues, and the involvement of youth and civil society.
- Working in partnership with regional and sub-regional organizations, other UN entities, and civil society groups to implement regional disarmament frameworks and treaties.

== Regional coverage ==
The centre supports 43 Member States in the Asia-Pacific region, spanning South Asia, East Asia, Southeast Asia, Central Asia, the Pacific Islands and parts of Oceania.

Member states include:

- Afghanistan
- Australia
- Bangladesh
- Bhutan
- Brunei Darussalam
- Cambodia
- China
- Democratic People's Republic of Korea
- Fiji
- India
- Indonesia
- Japan
- Kazakhstan
- Kiribati
- Kyrgyzstan
- Lao People's Democratic Republic
- Malaysia
- Maldives
- Marshall Islands
- Micronesia (Federated States of)
- Mongolia
- Myanmar
- Nauru
- Nepal
- New Zealand
- Pakistan
- Palau
- Papua New Guinea
- Philippines
- Republic of Korea
- Samoa
- Singapore
- Solomon Islands
- Sri Lanka
- Tajikistan
- Thailand
- Timor-Leste
- Tonga
- Turkmenistan
- Tuvalu
- Uzbekistan
- Vanuatu
- Viet Nam

== Focus areas ==
UNRCPD's work areas can be broadly organized into four pillars:

1. Conventional Weapons: The centre undertakes support for the implementation of the Arms Trade Treaty, the Programme of Action to Prevent, Combat and Eradicate the Illicit Trade in Small Arms and Light Weapons in All Its Aspects (PoA on SALW), and other instruments aimed at reducing the illicit trade in small arms and light weapons. For example, a 2016 capacity-building workshop on ATT implementation in the Pacific was organised by UNRCPD and the Government of Samoa.
2. Weapons of Mass Destruction (WMD) & Non-proliferation: The Centre assists states to implement treaties and mechanisms such as the Treaty on the Non‑Proliferation of Nuclear Weapons (NPT), the Treaty on the Prohibition of Nuclear Weapons (TPNW), the Chemical Weapons Convention (CWC), and the Biological Weapons Convention (BWC).
3. Peace and Disarmament Education: UNRCPD engages with youth, educators, and civil society to advance disarmament education, promote gender equality in disarmament processes, and contribute to peacebuilding.
4. Cross-cutting Issues: These include emerging technologies, gender mainstreaming, youth engagement, and links between disarmament, sustainable development and peacebuilding.

== Disarmament toolkit ==
In 2024 UNRCPD launched an online training course titled the "Disarmament Toolkit". The course is designed to increase access to disarmament, arms control and non-proliferation education among youth, civil society professionals and academics. The 2024 edition of the Toolkit featured six sessions and registered 628 participants from 80 countries. Topics included the core disarmament agendas, gender inclusive arms control, regional spotlight modules, and youth engagement.

== See also ==
- United Nations Regional Centre for Peace and Disarmament in Africa
- United Nations Regional Centre for Peace, Disarmament and Development in Latin America and the Caribbean
