= Catherine Pollard =

Guyanese diplomat

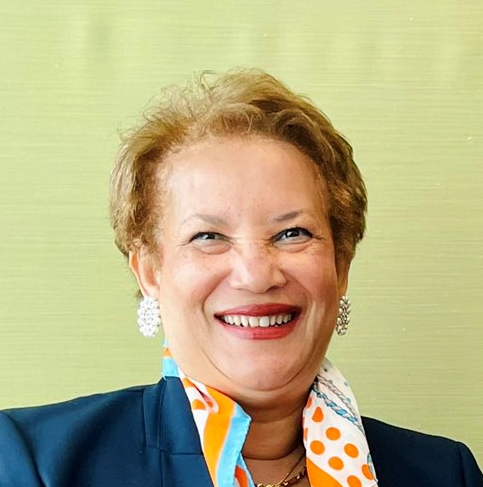
- Catherine Pollard, 2022.

United Nations Under-Secretary-General for Management Strategy, Policy and Compliance
- In office 1 September 2019 – Incumbent
- Preceded by: Jan Beagle

United Nations Under-Secretary-General for General Assembly and Conference Management
- In office 2015–2019
- Preceded by: Tegegnework Gettu
- Succeeded by: Movses Abelian

United Nations Assistant Secretary-General for General Assembly and Conference Management
- In office 2014–2015
- Succeeded by: Movses Abelian

Personal details
- Born: 1960 (age 64–65); Georgetown, Guyana
- Children: 0, 3 nieces and 1 nephew
- Education: University of the West Indies

Catherine Pollard (born 1960 in Georgetown, Guyana) is a diplomat who has been serving as Under Secretary-General of the United Nations for Management Strategy, Policy and Compliance since 2019. From 2015 until 2019, she was the Coordinator for Multilingualism for the United Nations; in this capacity, she also served as Under Secretary-General of the United Nations for General Assembly and Conference Management.

== Early life and education ==
Born in 1960, Pollard holds a master's degree in accounting from the University of the West Indies, Mona. Her father, Bryn Pollard, was a recipient of national honours for his legal and political works.

== Career ==
Pollard's career in the United Nations began in 1989 when she worked with the United Nations Development Programme (UNDP) as the Chief of National Execution Projects. In 1993, she joined the Department for Peacekeeping Operations; she then worked as Chief Budget Officer for the United Nations Operations in Yugoslavia and Central Headquarters. Thereafter, she served as Chief of the Budget and Finance Section of the United Nations Volunteers (UNV).

Pollard was Chief of Staff in the United Nations Department of Peacekeeping Operations, and before that, the Director of the Peacekeeping Finance Division in the Office of Programme Planning, Budget and Accounts.

Pollard became Assistant Secretary-General for Human Resources Management in 2008. She represented the Secretary-General on human resource management issues, providing advice on wide-ranging strategies and policies. She has led human resources reform initiatives and the introduction of new policies during her tenure including as Co-Chair of the Chief Executive Board/Human Resources Network for the United Nations common system.

From 2014 until 2015, Pollard served as Assistant Secretary-General for General Assembly and Conference Management.

Pollard was appointed Under-Secretary-General for General Assembly and Conference Management by the United Nations Secretary-General Ban Ki-moon in 2015, replacing Tegegnework Gettu. Shortly after, the Secretary-General also appointed Pollard as the Coordinator for Multilingualism in the United Nations Secretariat. She was Chair of the Board of Trustees of the United Nations International School from 2017-2022, a position appointed by the UN Secretary General.

== Other activities ==
- International Gender Champions (IGC), Member
