= Isobel Coleman =

American diplomat

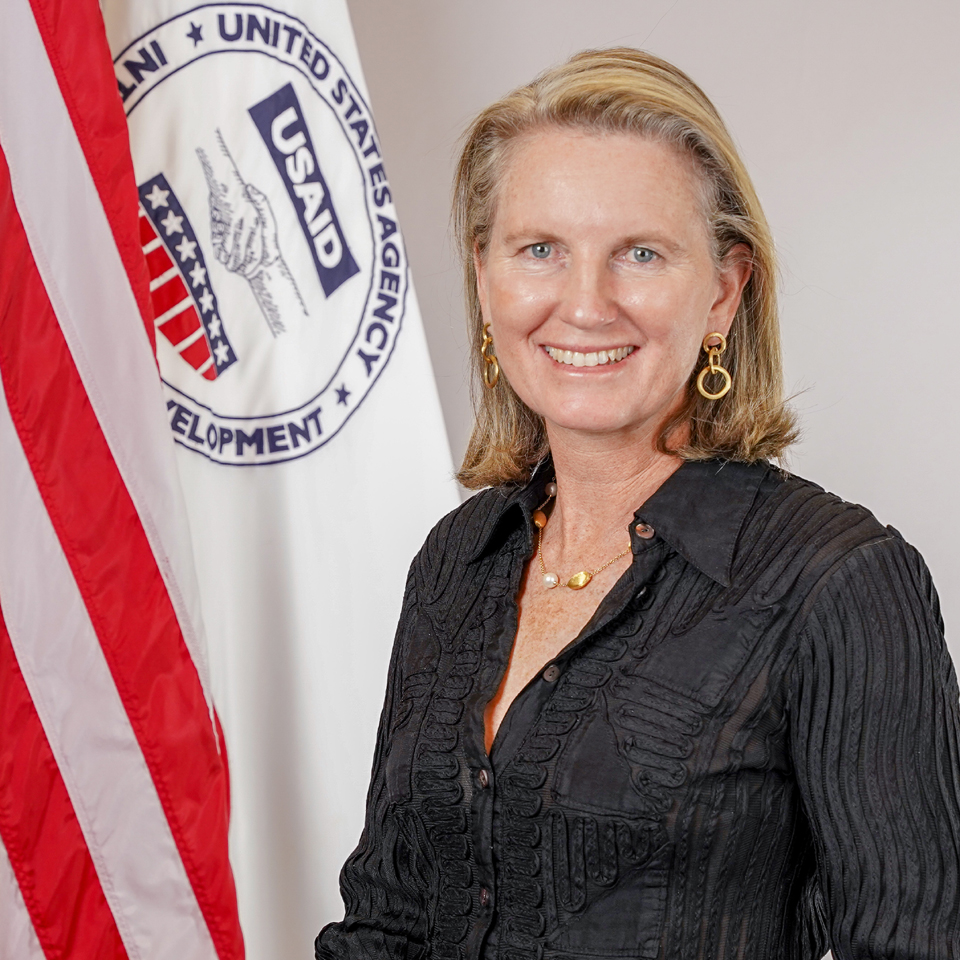

Chief Executive Officer, Alzheimer's Drug Discovery Foundation
- In office March 23, 2026 – Present

Deputy Administrator of the United States Agency for International Development for Policy and Programming
- In office November 15, 2021 – January 20, 2025
- President: Joe Biden
- Preceded by: Bonnie Glick
- Succeeded by: TBC

United States Ambassador to the United Nations for Management and Reform
- In office February 14, 2014 – January 20, 2017
- President: Barack Obama
- Preceded by: Joe Torsella
- Succeeded by: Cherith Norman Chalet

Personal details
- Education: Princeton University (BA); University of Oxford (MPhil, DPhil)

Isobel Coleman is an American non-profit executive, diplomat, author, entrepreneur, and former management consultant. She is Chief Executive Officer of the Alzheimer's Drug Discovery Foundation.

From 2021 to 2025, Coleman was Deputy Administrator for Policy and Programming at the United States Agency for International Development. As Deputy Administrator, Coleman was responsible for USAID’s policy and programming, overseeing the Agency’s Regional and Pillar Bureaus. She guided USAID’s crisis response, including representing USAID on the Deputies Committee of the National Security Council, and oversaw Agency efforts to promote food security, global health, democracy, and economic growth, and address the root causes of conflict.

Before joining USAID, Coleman was on the Biden Transition Team, leading the review of the U.S. Mission to the United Nations. During the second term of the Obama administration, she was the U.S. representative to the United Nations for UN Management and Reform with the rank of ambassador. During that time, she represented the United States in the UN General Assembly on budgetary matters and in the UN Security Council on Africa and peacekeeping issues. From 2018 to 2020, Coleman was the COO of GiveDirectly, a New York-based non-profit that helps families living in extreme poverty by making unconditional cash transfers via mobile phones. She was previously a senior fellow at the Council on Foreign Relations, CEO of a healthcare recruitment company and a partner with McKinsey & Company.

== Early life and education ==
Coleman graduated from Mamaroneck High School in Mamaroneck, New York. She then earned a Bachelor of Arts degree in East Asian studies, public policy, and international affairs from Princeton University. As a Marshall Scholar, she attended the University of Oxford, where she completed M.Phil. and D.Phil. degrees in international relations.

== Career ==
Coleman started her career as a management consultant with McKinsey & Company in New York in 1992 and was elected partner in the firm's financial institutions group in 1998. At McKinsey, she worked primarily with global financial service firms, including insurance, reinsurance and credit card companies, and global wholesale and retail banks. She also worked with the McKinsey Global Institute and in a pro-bono capacity with the New York City Board of Education. She left McKinsey to become CEO of NursingHands, Inc., a web-based business that provided continuing education, e-commerce and job placement for healthcare professionals. Coleman sold NursingHands in 2002 to strategic investor Jobson PLC, which merged the company with its multimedia property NurseWeek. In 2004, the combined business was bought by the media company Gannett.

=== Council on Foreign Relations ===
Returning to international affairs, Coleman became a senior fellow at the Council on Foreign Relations, where she focused on the political economy of the Middle East. In 2002, she founded CFR's Women and Foreign Policy program to focus foreign policy attention on the importance of improving the status of women around the world. In 2010, she became the founding director of CFR's Civil Society, Markets and Democracy program.

Coleman is known for her writing on women and economic development, including her groundbreaking article, "The Payoff From Women’s Rights" (Foreign Affairs, May 2004). She has also published widely about gender in the Middle East, including her 2010 book Paradise Beneath Her Feet: How Women are Transforming the Middle East (Random House), which the Los Angeles Times described as "outstanding" and The Economist as "nuanced." In 2012, she was the commencement speaker at Effat University in Jeddah, Saudi Arabia. In 2013, she delivered a talk at TedxMidAtlantic on how women are transforming the Middle East.

While at CFR, Coleman also published on a broad range of economic and political issues, including the challenge of post-revolution transition in Middle East countries such as Egypt and Tunisia, youth unemployment in the Middle East, and the region's need for fuel subsidy reform. She is the author, co-author and editor of, and contributor to, numerous books, including Women and Girls Rising: Progress and Resistance Around the World (Routledge, 2015), Pathways to Freedom: Political and Economic Lessons From Democratic Transitions (Council on Foreign Relations, 2013), The Unfinished Revolution: Voices from the Global Fight for Women’s Rights (Seven Stories Press, 2012), Restoring the Balance: A Middle East Strategy for the Next President (Brookings Institution Press, 2008), and Strategic Foreign Assistance: Civil Society in International Security (Hoover Press, 2006).

=== Ambassador ===
On September 12, 2014, President Barack Obama nominated Coleman to be U.S. representative to the United Nations for management and reform. She appeared before the United States Senate Committee on Foreign Relations for a confirmation hearing on December 2, 2014. In her statement before the Committee, Coleman noted the significant gap between the promise of the UN and the reality of its shortcomings, and vowed to ensure that the "UN is deploying its resources in the most efficient and effective way." She was confirmed by the U.S. Senate on December 16, 2014.

Coleman led U.S. efforts to reform the $40 billion UN system by imposing fiscal discipline, increasing transparency and accountability, and driving structural changes. During her tenure, the U.S. secured more than $500 million in annual peacekeeping budget reductions through the right-sizing of missions; the elimination of hundreds of UN back-office positions through automation; the first revision to the compensation package for UN staff, resulting in annual savings of more than $100 million; and significant efficiencies in the use of UN real estate.

Coleman was also a leader on the U.S. efforts to combat sexual exploitation and abuse by UN peacekeepers, helping to secure watershed resolutions that increased transparency through the naming of those countries with troops accused of abuses, and increased penalties through the repatriation of entire military contingents in the case of unaddressed or repeated abuse. She was the administration's chief spokesperson on these issues, testifying several times before the Senate Foreign Relations Committee. Additionally, she fought to end the unfair exclusion of Israel within the UN system, including by successfully negotiating a milestone agreement to recognize Yom Kippur as an official UN holiday. During the fall of 2016 and early 2017, Coleman represented the United States in the UN Security Council, with responsibility for Africa, Asia and peacekeeping issues. In that capacity, she negotiated Security Council resolutions on South Sudan, Darfur, The Gambia, Liberia, the Democratic Republic of Congo, and North Korea. She was also the lead negotiator of UN Security Council Resolution 2320 for stronger cooperation between the UN and the African Union.

=== Biden Administration ===
In November 2020, Coleman was named a member of the Joe Biden presidential transition Agency Review Team to support transition efforts related to the United States Mission to the United Nations.

During the Biden Administration, Coleman was appointed as Deputy Administrator at the U.S. Agency of International Development. She was Deputy Administrator from November 2021-January 20, 2025.

== Awards ==
In 2007, she was named the Isabel Benham Award winner by the Women's Bond Club (WBC) of New York. This award includes the privilege of directing a $25,000 donation from the WBC to a charity of the winner's choice. In 2011, Newsweek named Coleman one of the "150 Women Who Shake the World." In 2013, she was the recipient of the Dr. Jean Mayer Global Citizenship Award from Tufts University.

== Personal life ==
She is married to Struan Coleman, an orthopedic surgeon at the Hospital for Special Surgery, who is also the team physician for the New York Mets.

== See also ==
- Members of the Council on Foreign Relations

Diplomatic posts
Preceded by Joe Torsella	United States Ambassador to the United Nations for Management and Reform; 2014–2017	Succeeded by Cherith Norman Chalet
