= Marie-Andrée Leclerc =

Canadian serial killer (1945–1984)

- Born: October 26, 1945; Saint-Charles-de-Bellechasse, Quebec, Canada
- Died: April 20, 1984 (aged 38); Quebec City, Quebec, Canada
- Known for: Criminal accomplice to Charles Sobhraj

Marie-Andrée Leclerc (born October 26, 1945 – April 20, 1984) was a Canadian serial killer. An accomplice to Charles Sobhraj, she preyed on Western tourists travelling on the hippie trail of South Asia during the 1970s.

== Biography ==
Marie-Andrée Leclerc was born on October 26, 1945, in Saint-Charles-de-Bellechasse, Quebec, Canada. After studying in Quebec, she became a medical secretary at a clinic in Lévis.

In spring 1975, Leclerc went on a tourist trip to India with her then-fiancé. While in Srinagar, she met Charles Sobhraj and fell in love with him. Sobhraj acted as her guide throughout the country, and before the trip ended, he made her promise to return to Asia to see him again. After returning to Lévis, Leclerc received love letters from Sobhraj urging her to join him in Bangkok, his new home. He is believed to have bought her a plane ticket.

In July 1975, Leclerc departed for Thailand.

== Murders ==
Sobhraj and Leclerc made a living by carrying out scams; a typical scam was to help their targets out of difficult situations. In one instance, they helped two former French policemen, Yannick and Jacques, recover missing passports that Sobhraj himself had actually stolen. In another scheme, they provided shelter to a Frenchman, Dominique Renelleau, who appeared to be suffering from dysentery; in reality, he had been poisoned by the couple. The couple was later joined by a young Indian man, Ajay Chowdhury, a fellow criminal who became Sobhraj's second-in-command with Leclerc.

The three committed their first known murders in 1975. Most of the victims had spent some time with the pair before their deaths and were, according to investigators, recruited by Sobhraj and Chowdhury to join them in their crimes. Sobhraj claimed that most of his murders were accidental drug overdoses of temazepam and heroin, but investigators state that the victims had threatened to expose Sobhraj, which was his motive for murder. The first victim was a young woman from Seattle, Teresa Knowlton (named Jennie Bollivar in the book Serpentine), who was found drowned in a tidal pool in the Gulf of Thailand, wearing a flowered bikini. It was months later that Knowlton's post-mortem, as well as forensic evidence, proved that her drowning, originally believed to be a swimming accident, was murder.

The next victim was a young nomadic Turkish Sephardic Jew, Vitali Hakim, whose burnt body was found on the road to the Pattaya resort, where Sobhraj and his growing clan were staying. Dutch students Henk Bintanja, 29, and his fiancée Cornelia Hemker, 25, were invited to Thailand after meeting Sobhraj in Hong Kong. They, like many others, were poisoned by Sobhraj, who nursed them back to health in order to gain their obedience. As they recovered, Sobhraj was visited by his previous victim Hakim's French girlfriend, Charmayne Carrou, who had come to investigate her boyfriend's disappearance. Fearing exposure, Sobhraj and Chowdhury quickly hustled Bintanja and Hemker out. Their bodies were found strangled and burned on December 16, 1975. Soon after, Carrou was found drowned and wearing a similar-styled swimsuit to that of Sobhraj's earlier victim, Knowlton. Although the murders of the two women were not connected by investigators at the time, they would later earn Sobhraj the nickname "The Bikini Killer".

On December 18, the day the bodies of Bintanja and Hemker were identified, Sobhraj and Leclerc entered Nepal using the deceased couple's passports. They met in Nepal and, between December 21 and 22, murdered Canadian Laurent Carrière, 26, and American Connie Jo Bronzich, 29; the two victims were incorrectly identified by some sources as Laddie DuParr and Annabella Tremont. Sobhraj and Leclerc returned to Thailand, using their latest victims' passports before their bodies could be identified. Upon his return to Thailand, Sobhraj discovered that his three French companions had started to suspect him of serial murder, having found documents belonging to the murder victims. Sobhraj's former companions then fled to Paris after notifying local authorities.

Sobhraj's next destination was either Varanasi or Calcutta, where he murdered Israeli scholar Avoni Jacob to obtain Jacob's passport. Sobhraj used the passport to travel with Leclerc and Chowdhury—first to Singapore, then to India and, in March 1976, to return to Bangkok, despite knowing that the authorities there sought him. The clan were interrogated by Thai police in connection with the murders but were released.

Meanwhile, Dutch diplomat Herman Knippenberg and his then-wife Angela Kane were investigating the murders of Bintanja and Hemker. Knippenberg had some knowledge of, and had possibly even met, Sobhraj, although the latter's true identity was still unknown to the diplomat, who continued gathering evidence. With the help of Nadine and Remi Gires (Sobhraj's neighbours), Knippenberg built a case against Sobhraj. Knippenberg was eventually given police permission to search Sobhraj's apartment a full month after the suspect had left the country. Knippenberg found evidence, including victims' documents and passports, as well as poisons and syringes.

The criminal trio's next stop was Malaysia, where Chowdhury was sent to steal gems. Chowdhury was observed delivering the gems to Sobhraj. This was the last time he was seen; neither Chowdhury nor his remains have been found. It is believed Sobhraj murdered his former accomplice before leaving Malaysia in order to continue his and Leclerc's roles as gem dealers in Geneva. A source later claimed to have sighted Chowdhury in West Germany, but the claim appeared unsubstantiated, so the search for Chowdhury continued.

In May 1976, Interpol issued an international arrest warrant for Sobhraj, which charged him with four murders in Thailand.

Back in Asia, Sobhraj started forming a new criminal group, starting with two Western women, Barbara Smith and Mary Ellen Eather, in Bombay. Sobhraj's next victim was a Frenchman, Jean-Luc Solomon, who was poisoned during a robbery. The act was committed with the intention of incapacitating Solomon, but it killed him.

In July 1976, in New Delhi, Sobhraj, joined by his three-woman criminal clan, tricked a tour group of French post-graduate students into accepting them as tour guides. Sobhraj drugged them by giving them poisoned pills, which he told them were anti-dysentery medicine. When the drugs took effect more quickly than Sobhraj had anticipated, the students began to fall unconscious. Realising what Sobhraj had done, three of the students overpowered him and contacted the police, leading to his capture. Sobhraj's accomplices, Smith and Eather, confessed during interrogation. Sobhraj was charged with the murder of Solomon and all four were sent to Tihar Jail in New Delhi.

== Imprisonment and death ==
After being incarcerated in Tihar prison, Marie-Andrée Leclerc faced accusations of complicity in the murders of Jean-Luc Salomon and Avoni Jacob in India. While she was acquitted of the murder of Salomon on July 28, 1978, she was still required to remain in prison while awaiting the trial for the murder of Jacob. During this period, Leclerc testified on behalf of Sobhraj in his own trial. The couple denied ever having met Jean-Luc Salomon, and Leclerc was outraged when Sobhraj was finally convicted of murder.

In 1980, both Leclerc and Sobhraj were convicted of the murder of Avoni Jacob. While Leclerc decided to appeal the judgment, her release from prison was approved with the condition that she could not leave the country.

In July 1983, Marie-Andrée Leclerc was diagnosed with ovarian cancer and was permitted to return to Canada. However, she was required to report to the Indian High Commission in Ottawa every three months and had to return to India for further trial when her health allowed. The court demanded a bail of $18,000, which was paid for by religious communities.

In autumn 1983, she published a book titled "Je reviens" ("I'm coming back") in which she shared her side of the story.

Leclerc died from cancer on April 20, 1984, aged 38, in Quebec City.
