= United Nations Regional Centre for Peace and Disarmament in Africa =

United Nations regional office in Togo

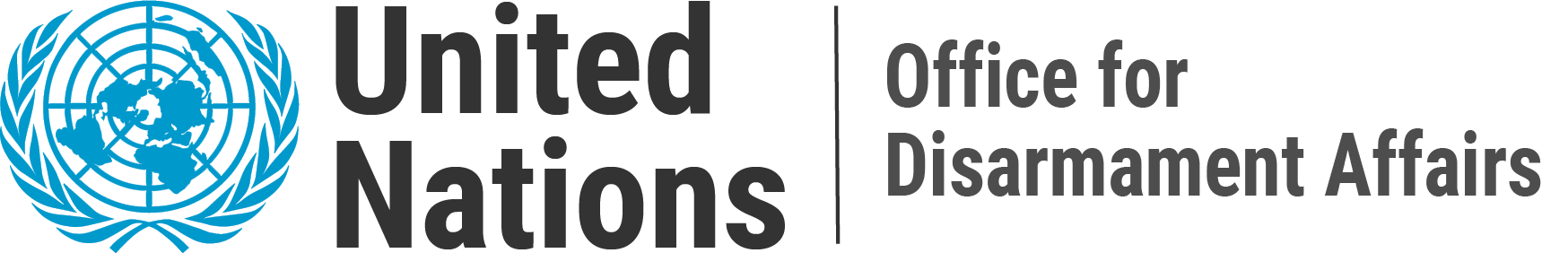
- Abbreviation: UNREC
- Established: January 1986; 40 years ago
- Founder: United Nations General Assembly
- Type: Regional centre of the United Nations Office for Disarmament Affairs
- Purpose: Disarmament, non-proliferation, peacekeeping
- Headquarters: New York City
- Location: Lomé, Togo
- Coordinates: 6.1933766°N 1.2087729°E
- Region served: Africa
- Methods: Multilateral discussions and educational initiatives
- Director: Anselme Nahmtante Yabouri
- Parent organization: UNODA
- Website: www.unrec.org

The United Nations Regional Centre for Peace and Disarmament in Africa (UNREC) is a regional office of the United Nations Office for Disarmament Affairs located in Lomé, Togo. It is mandated to support member states in Africa on issues of disarmament, arms control and non-proliferation. It assists African countries in promoting peace and security in the region.

== History ==
Resolution adopted at the 40th session of the UN General Assembly which established the United Nations Regional Centre for Peace and Disarmament in Africa

UNREC was established through UN General Assembly resolution A/40/151G, dated 16 December 1985.

== Mandate and functions ==
UNREC's mandate, as defined in the founding resolution, is to provide, on request, substantive support to African member states for initiatives aimed at achieving peace, arms control and disarmament in the region.

Its principal functions include:

- Supporting dialogue and confidence-building among states in the region.
- Providing capacity-building, legal and technical assistance to states in the region.
- Cooperating with regional and sub-regional organizations (for example the African Union) and coordinating regional activities to promote arms control and disarmament.

== Regional coverage ==
The centre supports 55 member states in the African region.

Member states include:

- Algeria
- Angola
- Benin
- Botswana
- Burkina Faso
- Burundi
- Cabo Verde
- Cameroon
- Central African Republic
- Chad
- Comoros
- Democratic Republic of the Congo
- Republic of the Congo
- Côte d'Ivoire
- Djibouti
- Egypt
- Equatorial Guinea
- Eritrea
- Ethiopia
- Gabon
- The Gambia
- Ghana
- Guinea
- Guinea-Bissau
- Kenya
- Lesotho
- Liberia
- Libya
- Madagascar
- Malawi
- Mali
- Mauritania
- Mauritius
- Morocco
- Mozambique
- Namibia
- Niger
- Nigeria
- Rwanda
- São Tomé and Príncipe
- Senegal
- Seychelles
- Sierra Leone
- Somalia
- South Africa
- South Sudan
- Sudan
- Swaziland
- Tanzania
- Togo
- Tunisia
- Uganda
- Zambia
- Zimbabwe

== See also ==
- United Nations Regional Centre for Peace and Disarmament in Asia and the Pacific
- United Nations Regional Centre for Peace, Disarmament and Development in Latin America and the Caribbean
