= Inspector Zende =

- Official release poster
- Directed by: Chinmay Mandlekar
- Written by: Chinmay Mandlekar
- Produced by: Jay Shewakramani; Om Raut
- Starring: Manoj Bajpayee; Jim Sarbh; Sachin Khedekar
- Cinematography: Vishal Sinha
- Edited by: Meghna Manchanda Sen
- Music by: Sanket Sane
- Production company: Northern Lights Films
- Distributed by: Netflix
- Release date: 5 September 2025
- Running time: 112 minutes
- Country: India
- Language: Hindi

Inspector Zende is a 2025 Indian Hindi-language comedy thriller film directed and written by Chinmay Mandlekar and produced by Jay Shewakramani and Om Raut. The film stars Manoj Bajpayee as Inspector Madhukar Zende and Jim Sarbh as Carl Bhojraj, a character inspired by the infamous serial killer Charles Sobhraj. It was released on 5 September 2025 on Netflix.

== Plot ==
Inspector Zende was a smart police officer who had caught the notorious serial killer Carl Bhojraj 15 years ago. In the current timeline (1980) he gets the news of Carl running away from Tihar jail. He sets up with his team to apprehend him again.

== Cast ==
- Manoj Bajpayee as Inspector Madhukar Bapurao Zende, Maharashtra Police
- Jim Sarbh as Carl Bhojraj, French criminal / Bikini killer and robber
- Sachin Khedekar as DGP Chandrakant S. Purandhare
- Girija Oak as Vijaya Zende, Zende's wife
- Bhalchandra Kadam as Constable Bhalchandra Patil alias Rushi Kadoo
- Vaibhav Mangle as PI Fonseca, Panji Police station, Goa Police
- Harish Dudhade as ASI Jacob D'Costa, Maharashtra Police
- Onkar Raut as Patekar
- Bharat Savale as Naik
- Devaang Bagga as Lalit
- Nitin Bhajan as Ram Deshmane
- Madhav Vaze as Joshi Kaka

== Production ==
The film is directed and penned by Chinmay Mandlekar in his directorial debut. The film draws from the real-life story of Madhukar Zende, the Mumbai police officer who arrested Charles Sobhraj twice; once in 1971 and again in Goa in 1986 after his escape from Tihar Jail.

== Marketing ==
The project was officially announced by Netflix on 7 August 2025 with Manoj Bajpayee and Jim Sarbh in lead.

== Release ==
The film premiered exclusively on Netflix on 5 September 2025.

== Reception ==
On the review aggregator website Rotten Tomatoes, 60% of 15 critics' reviews are positive, with an average rating of 6/10. Radhika Sharma of NDTV gave 3.5 stars out of 5 and said that "Inspector Zende would have remained incomplete without its superb supporting cast with memorable performances." Rahul Desai of The Hollywood Reporter India observed that "'Inspector Zende' stands out because of the genre it chooses." Anuj Kumar of The Hindu wrote "A string of heart-warming moments and a malleable Manoj keep us invested in this otherwise generic hunt for the Serpent."

Udita Jhunjhunwala writing for Mint said that "Muddled history and a parodic tone hamper this new film version of the Charles Sobhraj story." Shubhra Gupta of The Indian Express gave 2 stars out of 5 and said that " The attempt at a serio-comic tone in the Manoj Bajpayee-Jim Sarbh film falls flat with only an occasional leap or two, with the writing struggling to match the audacity of the criminal and the enterprise of his nemesis." Mayur Sanap of Rediff.com rated 2/5 stars and observed that "Inspector Zende had the potential to be genuinely entertaining. Instead, it settles for formulaic fun."

Rishabh Suri of Hindustan Times gave 3 stars out of 5 and said that "Overall, Inspector Zende is an engaging watch in parts, lifted by Manoj Bajpayee’s steady presence and a cast that rises to the occasion. Yet the repetition in storytelling keeps it from reaching the heights its premise promised. At three stars, this is a serviceable thriller with a humorous streak, more enjoyable for its performances than its plot." Nandini Ramnath of Scroll.in observed that "Inspector Zende often resembles a tacky old Hindi movie in which cops arrive at the scene after the criminal has bolted. Some of the parodic humour is contributed by Zende, an old-fashioned specimen of law enforcement who doggedly pursues his target." Lachmi Deb Roy of Firstpost rated it 3/5 stars and said that "Everything said and done, the film is immensely superior to the other releases of this week and as usual Manoj Bajpayee is absolutely phenomenal. I assure watching this film is going to be damn good fun."

Shubham Kulkarni of OTT Play rated it 2.5/5 star and said that "The new Netflix film aspires to turn a gory story into a pulp fiction-like narrative but forgets that aspiration midway." Jaya Dwivedie of India TV rated it 3.5/5 stars and writes "'Inspector Zende' definitely deserves a watch. Carl Bhojraj's story has been shown on screen many times before, but this is completely Inspector Zende's story, a real hero who is a part of the justice system, whose story needs to be known worldwide. The film has masala, emotions, and patriotism, which puts this film in the category of great films." Archika Khurana of The Times of India gave 3.5 stars out of 5 and said that "Watch it for Manoj Bajpayee and Jim Sarbh’s performances, nostalgic 80s Mumbai, and a light-hearted take on a legendary manhunt."

Devesh Sharma of Filmfare rated it 3/5 stars and said that " It doesn’t dig deep into the psychology of its infamous subject, nor does it fully exploit the humour of its premise. What keeps it afloat is Bajpayee’s brilliance and the sincerity of its supporting cast. A lighter take on a dark chapter of history, Inspector Zende may not thrill, but it does amuse. Subhash K Jha of News 24 rated it 2/5 stars and said that "What is so funny about a cop trying to nab a notorious criminal? One would like to ask writer-director Chinmay Mandlekar why he thought it prudent to use the facetious tone of narration for a crime story that shook the world? And why is crime a laughing matter in the first place?" Bollywood Hungama gave it 3.5 stars out 5 and said that "On the whole, INSPECTOR ZENDE is a refreshing blend of real-life inspiration and quirky storytelling, and stands out for its humor, crisp runtime, and stellar performances, especially Manoj Bajpayee and Jim Sarbh."
