= United Nations Regional Centre for Peace, Disarmament and Development in Latin America and the Caribbean =

United Nations regional office in Peru

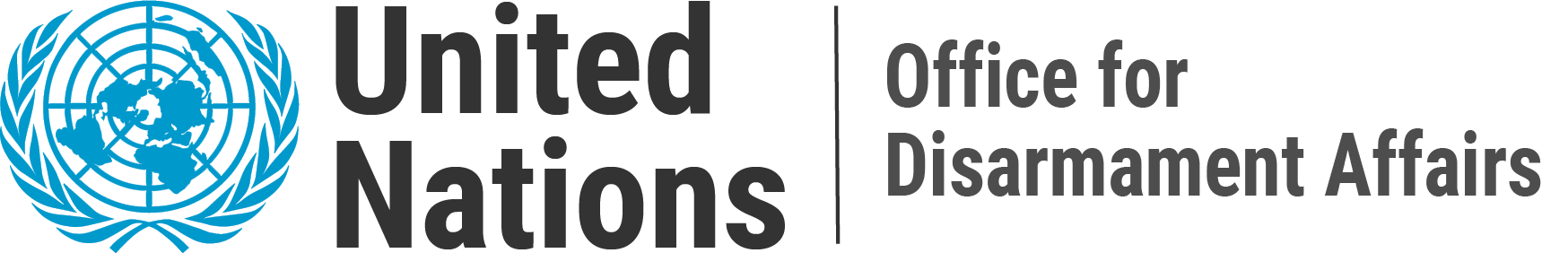
- Abbreviation: UNLIREC
- Established: 3 December 1986; 39 years ago
- Founder: United Nations General Assembly
- Type: Regional centre of the United Nations Office for Disarmament Affairs
- Purpose: Disarmament, development, non-proliferation, peacekeeping
- Headquarters: New York City
- Location: Lima, Peru
- Coordinates: 12.1209312°S 77.0368151°W
- Region served: Latin America and the Caribbean
- Methods: Multilateral discussions and educational initiatives
- Director: Soledad Urruela
- Parent organization: UNODA
- Website: www.unlirec.org

The United Nations Regional Centre for Peace, Disarmament and Development in Latin America and the Caribbean (UNLIREC) is a regional office of the United Nations Office for Disarmament Affairs located in Lima, Peru. It supports member states in Latin America and the Caribbean in the fields of disarmament, arms control, non-proliferation and related development issues.

== History ==
Resolution adopted at the 41st session of the UN General Assembly which established the United Nations Regional Centre for Peace, Disarmament and Development in Latin America and the Caribbean

UNLIREC was established through UN General Assembly resolution A/41/60J, dated 3 December 1986.

== Mandate and functions ==
UNLIREC's mandate is to provide, upon request, substantive support to states in Latin America and the Caribbean for the implementation of measures for peace and security, and for the promotion of economic and social development.

Its principal functions include:

- Assisting states in implementing international instruments and commitments on disarmament, arms control and non-proliferation.
- Providing legal, policy and technical assistance (such as for firearms and ammunition management, marking/tracing, stockpile safety, destruction).
- Capacity building training of justice, security and law enforcement officials in areas such as illicit trafficking of small arms and light weapons, and gender perspectives in arms control.
- Engaging youth, women, civil society, and integrating gender perspectives into disarmament and arms-control programs.

== Regional coverage ==
The centre supports 33 member states in the Americas.

Member states include:

- Antigua and Barbuda
- Argentina
- Bahamas
- Barbados
- Belize
- Bolivia
- Brazil
- Chile
- Colombia
- Costa Rica
- Cuba
- Dominican Republic
- Dominica
- Ecuador
- El Salvador
- Grenada
- Guatemala
- Guyana
- Haiti
- Honduras
- Jamaica
- Mexico
- Nicaragua
- Panama
- Paraguay
- Peru
- Saint Lucia
- Saint Vincent and the Grenadines
- Saint Kitts and Nevis
- Suriname
- Trinidad and Tobago
- Uruguay
- Venezuela

== See also ==
- United Nations Regional Centre for Peace and Disarmament in Africa
- United Nations Regional Centre for Peace and Disarmament in Asia and the Pacific
