= Cherith Norman Chalet =

American diplomat

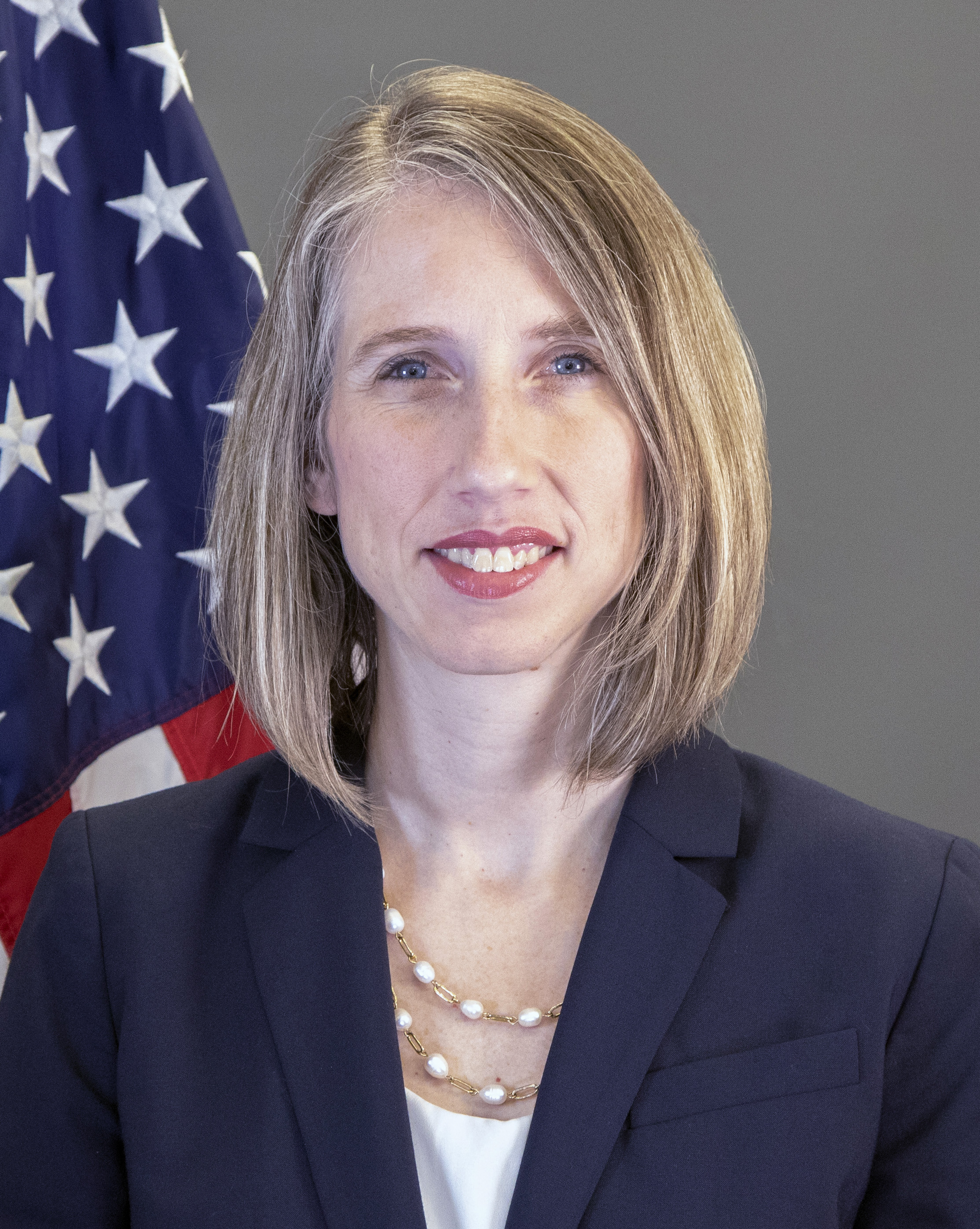

United Nations Assistant Secretary-General for General Assembly and Conference Management
- In office 4 March 2021 – Incumbent
- Preceded by: Movses Abelian

United States Ambassador for United Nations Management and Reform
- In office 17 October 2018 – 20 January 2021
- President: Donald Trump
- Preceded by: Isobel Coleman
- Succeeded by: Chris Lu

Personal details
- Children: 3
- Education: Bob Jones University

Cherith Ann Norman Chalet is an American diplomat who served as Ambassador for United Nations Management and Reform at the United States Mission to the United Nations from 2018 to 2021 before being appointed Assistant Secretary-General for General Assembly and Conference Management in the United Nations Secretariat.

== Education ==
Born in North Carolina, Chalet studied history and political science at Bob Jones University in South Carolina.

== Career ==
Chalet worked in Washington, D.C., for Senator Jim DeMint before serving in the Bureau of Legislative Affairs of the United States Department of State as a senior legislative liaison between the State Department and the United States House Committee on Appropriations. In 2008 she joined the United States Mission to the United Nations, where she held various roles, including representative to the General Assembly's Fifth Committee. In 2018 she was appointed by President Donald Trump as Ambassador for United Nations Management and Reform.

In 2021 the Secretary-General of the United Nations, António Guterres, appointed Chalet to succeed Movses Abelian as Assistant Secretary-General for General Assembly and Conference Management in the United Nations Secretariat.

== Personal life ==
Chalet is married with three children.
