= United Nations Office for Disarmament Affairs =

Office of the United Nations Secretariat

Office for Disarmament Affairs

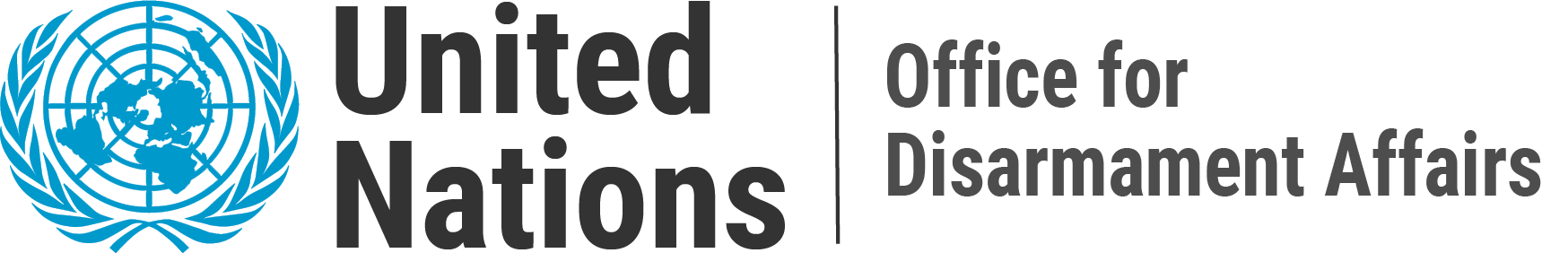
- Abbreviation: UNODA
- Formation: 1998
- Type: Department of the Secretariat
- Legal status: Active
- Head: High Representative for Disarmament Affairs (Japan) Izumi Nakamitsu
- Parent organization: United Nations Secretariat
- Subsidiaries: UNLIREC, UNREC, UNRCPD
- Website: www.un.org/disarmament/

The UN Office for Disarmament Affairs (abbr. UNODA, French: Bureau des affaires du désarmement) is an Office of the United Nations Secretariat established in January 1998 as the Department for Disarmament Affairs, part of United Nations secretary-general Kofi Annan's plan to reform the UN as presented in his report to the General Assembly in July 1997.

Its goal is to promote nuclear disarmament and non-proliferation and the strengthening of the disarmament regimes in respect to other weapons of mass destruction, chemical and biological weapons. It also promotes disarmament efforts in the area of conventional weapons, especially landmines and small arms, which are often the weapons of choice in contemporary conflicts.

It is led by an Under-Secretary-General (USG) and High Representative (HR), Izumi Nakamitsu of Japan, who took office on 1 May 2017.

Secretary-General's Bulletin establishing the structure and responsibilities of the Department for Disarmament Affairs, which was later renamed UNODA.

== History ==
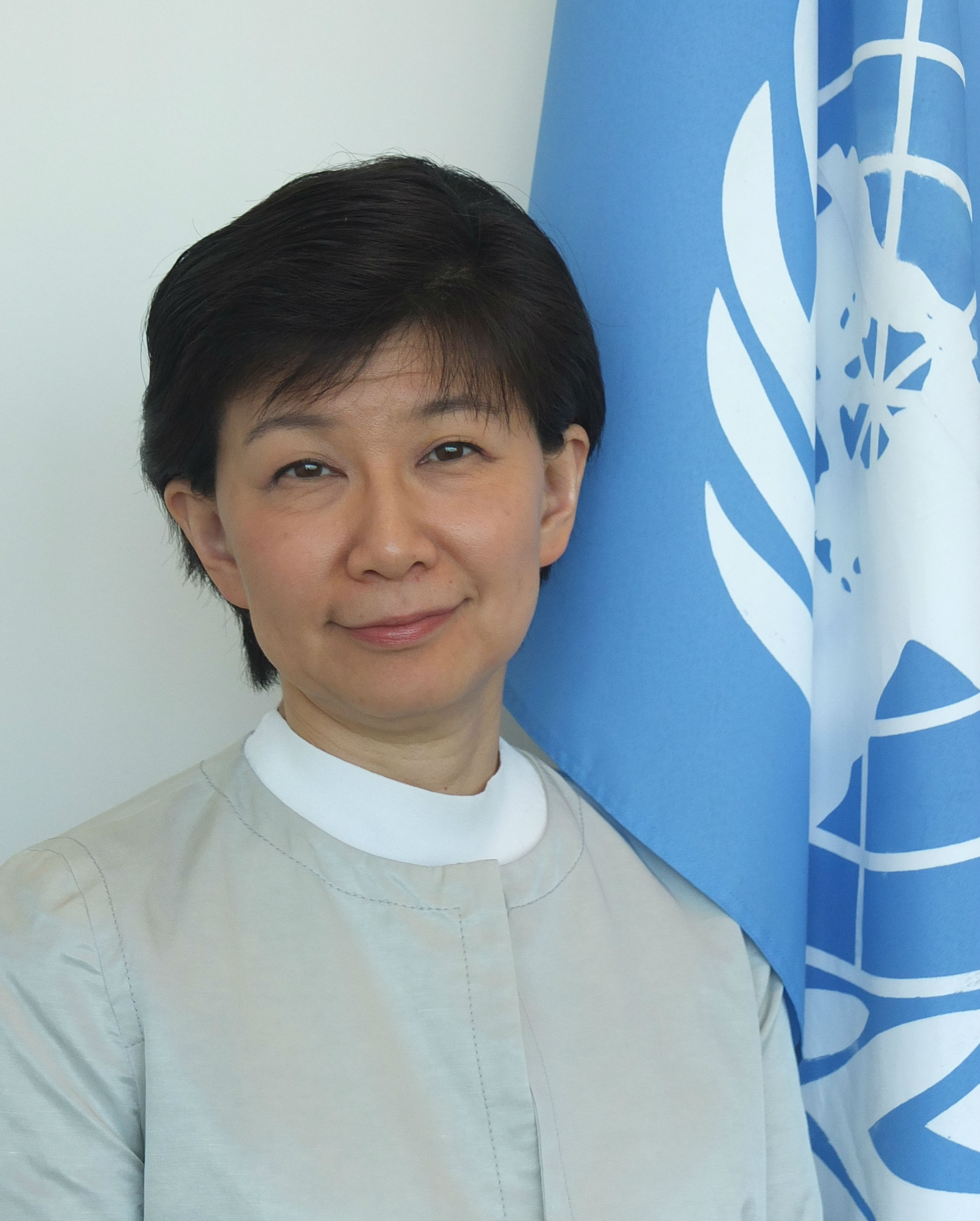
Izumi Nakamitsu, the United Nations High Representative for Disarmament Affairs

In its landmark resolution 1653 of 1961, "Declaration on the prohibition of the use of nuclear and thermo-nuclear weapons", the UN General Assembly stated that the use of nuclear weaponry "would exceed even the scope of war and cause indiscriminate suffering and destruction to mankind and civilization and, as such, is contrary to the rules of international law and to the laws of humanity".

The United Nations Office for Disarmament Affairs (UNODA) had originally been established as a department in 1982 upon the recommendation of the General Assembly's second special session on disarmament (SSOD II). In 1992, it became the Centre for Disarmament Affairs, working under the Department of Political Affairs. At the end of 1997, it reverted to being the Department for Disarmament Affairs. Then, in 2007, Secretary-General Ban Ki-moon announced the appointment of Sérgio de Queiroz Duarte of Brazil as the High Representative for Disarmament Affairs at the Under-Secretary-General (USG) level and the department became the United Nations Office for Disarmament Affairs. Following the retirement of Sérgio Duarte in February 2012, Angela Kane, then USG for Management, was appointed as the new High Representative for Disarmament Affairs. She was the first woman and first non diplomat appointed to this position.

== Mission ==
UNODA provides substantive and organizational support for norm-setting in the area of disarmament through the work of the UN General Assembly and its First Committee, the Disarmament Commission, the Conference on Disarmament and other bodies. It fosters preventive disarmament measures, such as dialogue, transparency and confidence-building on military matters, and encourages regional disarmament efforts. The latter includes the UN Register of Conventional Arms and regional forums. It also provides information on the United Nations disarmament efforts.

UNODA supports the development and implementation of practical disarmament measures after a conflict, such as disarming and demobilizing former combatants and helping them to reintegrate in civil society.

== Structure ==
The United Nations Office for Disarmament Affairs comprises five branches: Conference on Disarmament Secretariat and Conference Support Branch (Geneva), Weapons of Mass Destruction Branch (WMD), Conventional Arms (including Practical Disarmament) Branch (CAB), the Information and Outreach Branch (IOB) and, Regional Disarmament Branch (RDB). RDB further manages three regional centers.

Branches and centers are organized as follows:

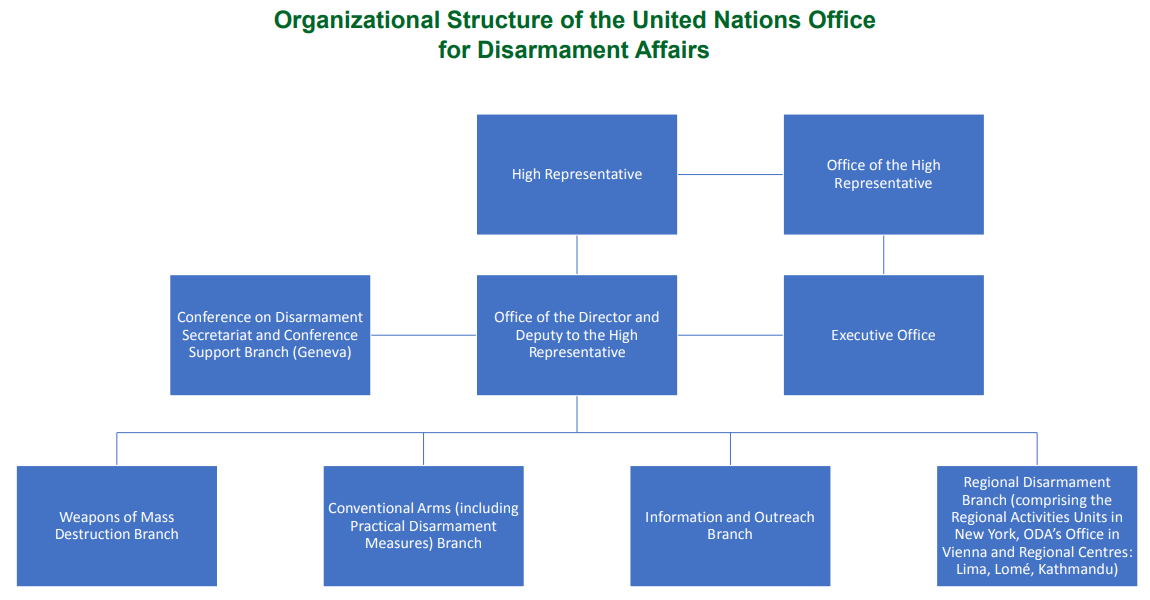
Structure of UNODA

== Activities ==
=== Conference on Disarmament Secretariat and Conference Support Branch ===
The Conference on Disarmament Secretariat and Conference Support Branch, based in Geneva, provides organizational and substantive servicing to the Conference on Disarmament (CD), the single multilateral disarmament negotiating forum of the international community.

=== Weapons of Mass Destruction Branch ===
The WMD Branch provides substantive support in the area of the disarmament of weapons of mass destruction (nuclear, chemical and biological weapons). It supports and participates in multilateral efforts to strengthen the non-proliferation of WMD and in this connection cooperates with the relevant intergovernmental organizations and specialized agencies of the United Nations system, in particular the IAEA, the OPCW and the CTBTO PrepCom.

=== Conventional Arms (including Practical Disarmament Measures) Branch ===
The CAB focuses its efforts in the conventional field (all weapons not considered WMDs, including small arms and light weapons) of promoting transparency and confidence-building, curbing the flow of small arms in regions of tension, and developing measures of practical disarmament. It is responsible for substantive conference support on the UN Programme of Action on small arms, the Arms Trade Treaty process, and the UN transparency registers. CAB chairs the UN-internal coordination mechanism on small arms, CASA.

=== Information and Outreach Branch ===
The IO Branch organizes a wide variety of special events and programmes in the field of disarmament, produces ODA publications such as the Disarmament Yearbook and occasional papers, and maintains the databases for specialized areas such as Register of Conventional Arms, Status of Treaties and Article 7 - Mine-Ban Convention.

=== Regional Disarmament Branch ===
The Regional Disarmament Branch (RDB) provides substantive support, including advisory services, to Member States, regional and subregional organizations on disarmament measures and related security matters.

RDB oversees and coordinates the activities of the three regional centres:

- UN Regional Centre for Peace and Disarmament in Africa (UNREC)
- UN Regional Centre for Peace and Disarmament in Asia and the Pacific (UNRCPD)
- UN Regional Centre for Peace, Disarmament and Development in Latin America and the Caribbean (UNLIREC)

== High Representatives for Disarmament Affairs ==
Former heads of UNODA and UNODA predecessors
Under-Secretary-General	Country of nationality	Years served	UN Secretary-General
Jan Mårtenson	Sweden	1982–1987	Javier Pérez de Cuéllar
Yasushi Akashi	Japan	1987–1991	Javier Pérez de Cuéllar
Prvoslav Davinić	Yugoslavia	1992–1997	Boutros Boutros-Ghali
Jayantha Dhanapala	Sri Lanka	1998–2003	Kofi Annan
Nobuyasu Abe	Japan	2003–2006	Kofi Annan
Nobuaki Tanaka	Japan	2006–2007	Kofi Annan
Sérgio de Queiroz Duarte	Brazil	2007–2012	Ban Ki-moon
Angela Kane	Germany	2012–2015	Ban Ki-moon
Kim Won-soo	South Korea	2015–2017	Ban Ki-moon António Guterres
Izumi Nakamitsu	Japan	2017–present	António Guterres

== See also ==
- Conference on Disarmament
- Disarmament Insight
- International Campaign to Abolish Nuclear Weapons
- International Day for the Total Elimination of Nuclear Weapons
- United Nations Institute for Disarmament Research (UNIDIR)
- Draft Treaty and Annual UN Conferences
