= Charles Sobhraj =

French serial killer (born 1944)

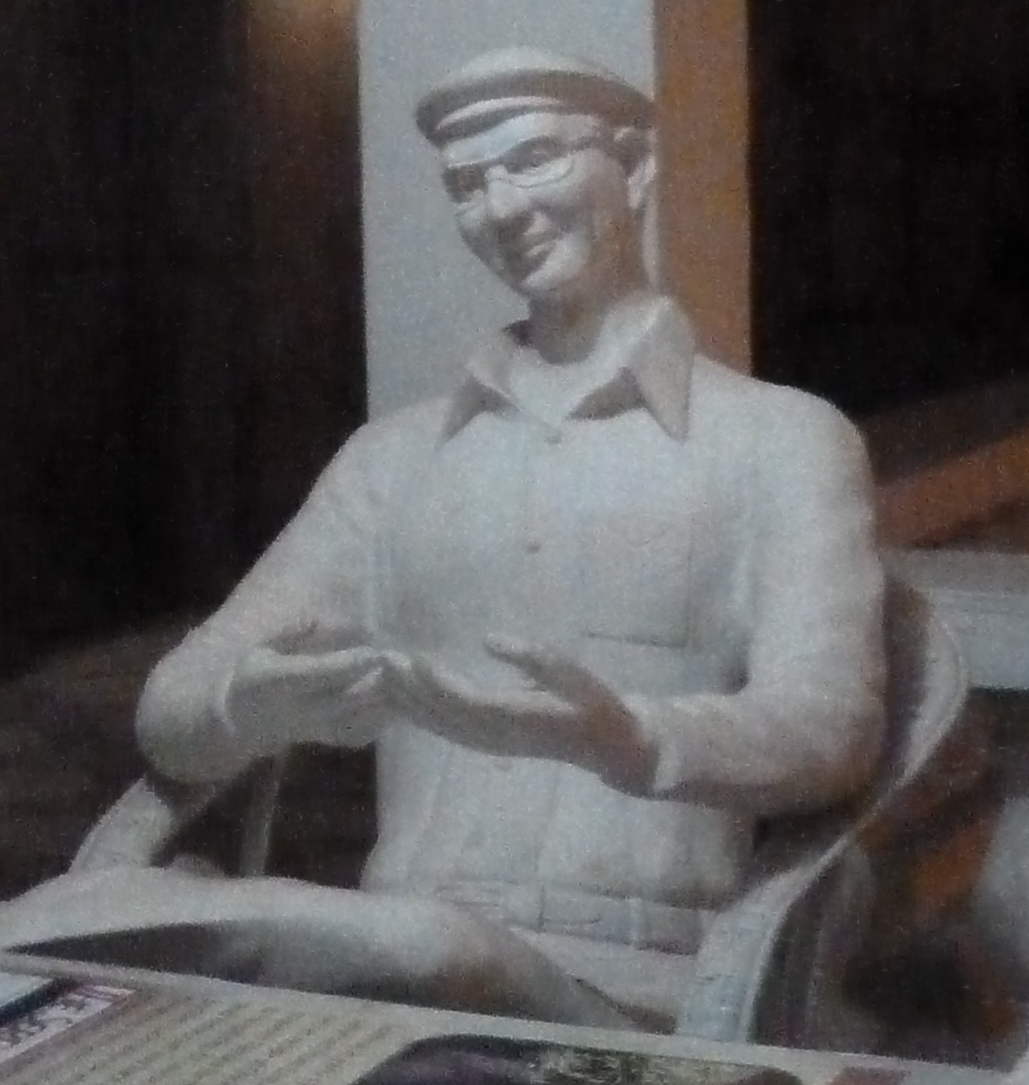
- Statue depicting Sobhraj at the O'Coqueiro restaurant, Porvorim, Goa, India
- Born: Hotchand Bhawnani Gurmukh Sobhraj; 6 April 1944 (age 82); Saigon, French Indochina
- Other names: Bikini Killer; Splitting Killer; The Serpent
- Spouses: Chantal Compagnon (m. 1969) Nihita Biswas (m. 2008)
- Children: 1
- Status: Guilty (Note: Released in December 2022 due to old age.)
- Convictions: Murder (2004 and 2014)
- Penalty: 12 years (c. 1975); 10 years (c. 1987); Life imprisonment (2004); 1 year (2010); 20 years (2014)

Details
- Victims: 12 confirmed, possibly 31
- Span of crimes: 1963–1976
- Country: Thailand, Nepal, India, Malaysia, France, Afghanistan, Turkey, Greece
- Date apprehended: 2003

Charles Sobhraj (born Hotchand Bhawnani Gurmukh Sobhraj; 6 April 1944) is a French serial killer, fraudster, and thief whose victims were mainly Western tourists travelling on the hippie trail of South Asia during the 1970s. He is of Sindhi and Vietnamese origin. He was known as the Bikini Killer because of the attire of several of his victims, as well as the Splitting Killer and the Serpent for "his snake-like ability to avoid detection by authorities".

It is thought that Sobhraj murdered at least 20 tourists in South and Southeast Asia, including 14 in Thailand. He was convicted and jailed in India from 1976 to 1997. After his release he returned to France. Sobhraj went to Nepal in 2003, where he was arrested, tried, and given a life sentence. On 21 December 2022, the Supreme Court of Nepal ordered his release from prison because of his old age, after he had served 19 years of his prison term. On 23 December 2022, he was released and deported to France.

Described as "handsome, charming and utterly without scruple", he used his looks and cunning to advance his criminal career and obtain celebrity status; he is known to have enjoyed his infamy. Sobhraj has been the subject of four biographies, three documentaries, a Bollywood film titled Main Aur Charles, a 2021 eight-part BBC/Netflix drama series The Serpent and the 2025 Netflix India series Black Warrant and the film Inspector Zende.

== Early years ==
Hotchand Bhawnani Gurmukh Sobhraj was born on 6 April 1944 in Saigon, within the Indochinese Union, to a Indian Sindhi father and Vietnamese mother. Sobhraj's birthplace being a French colonial territory made him eligible for French citizenship. His parents were never married and his father denied paternity. Sobhraj was taken in by his mother's new husband, a French Army lieutenant stationed in French Indochina. His name was entered as Charles Gurmukh Sobhraj in church records in 1959. In his new family, he felt neglected in favour of the couple's later children. Sobhraj continued to move back and forth between Southeast Asia and France with the family.

As a teenager, he began to commit petty crimes; he received his first custodial sentence for burglary in 1963, serving his sentence at Poissy prison near Paris. While imprisoned, Sobhraj manipulated prison officials into granting him special favours, such as being allowed to keep books in his cell. Around the same time, he met and endeared himself to Felix d'Escogne, a wealthy young man and prison volunteer.

After being paroled, Sobhraj moved in with d'Escogne and spent his time moving between the high society of Paris and the criminal underworld. He began accumulating riches through a series of burglaries and scams. During this time, Sobhraj met and began a romantic relationship with Chantal Compagnon, a young Parisian woman from a conservative family. Sobhraj proposed marriage to Compagnon but was arrested later the same day for attempting to evade police while driving a stolen vehicle. He was sentenced to eight months in prison, yet Chantal remained supportive throughout the entirety of his sentence. Sobhraj and Compagnon were married upon his release. By 1970, he had become a French citizen through his mother, as she was a natural-born citizen of Vietnam, a former French colony.

Sobhraj, along with a pregnant Compagnon, left France in 1970 for Asia to escape arrest. After travelling through Eastern Europe with fake documents, robbing tourists whom they befriended along the way, Sobhraj arrived in Bombay (Mumbai) later the same year. Chantal gave birth to a baby girl, Usha, in the city. In the meantime, Sobhraj resumed his criminal life, running a car theft and smuggling operation. Sobhraj's growing profits went towards his budding gambling addiction.

In 1973, Sobhraj was arrested and imprisoned after an unsuccessful armed robbery attempt at a jeweller's at The Ashok, in New Delhi. Sobhraj was able to escape, with Compagnon's help, by faking illness, but was recaptured shortly thereafter. Sobhraj borrowed money for bail from his father, and soon afterwards fled to Kabul. There, the couple began to rob tourists on the hippie trail and were arrested again. Sobhraj escaped in the same way he had in India, feigning illness and drugging the hospital guard. Sobhraj fled to Iran, leaving his family behind. Compagnon, though still loyal to Sobhraj, wished to leave their criminal past and returned to France, vowing never to see him again.

Sobhraj spent the next two years on the run, using as many as 10 stolen passports. He passed through various countries in Eastern Europe and the Middle East. Sobhraj was joined by his younger half-brother, André, in Istanbul. Sobhraj and André became partners in crime, participating in various criminal activities in both Turkey and Greece. The duo were eventually arrested in Athens. After an identity-switch hoax went awry, Sobhraj managed to escape but his half-brother was left behind. André was handed over to the Turkish police by Greek authorities and served an 18-year sentence.

== Murders ==
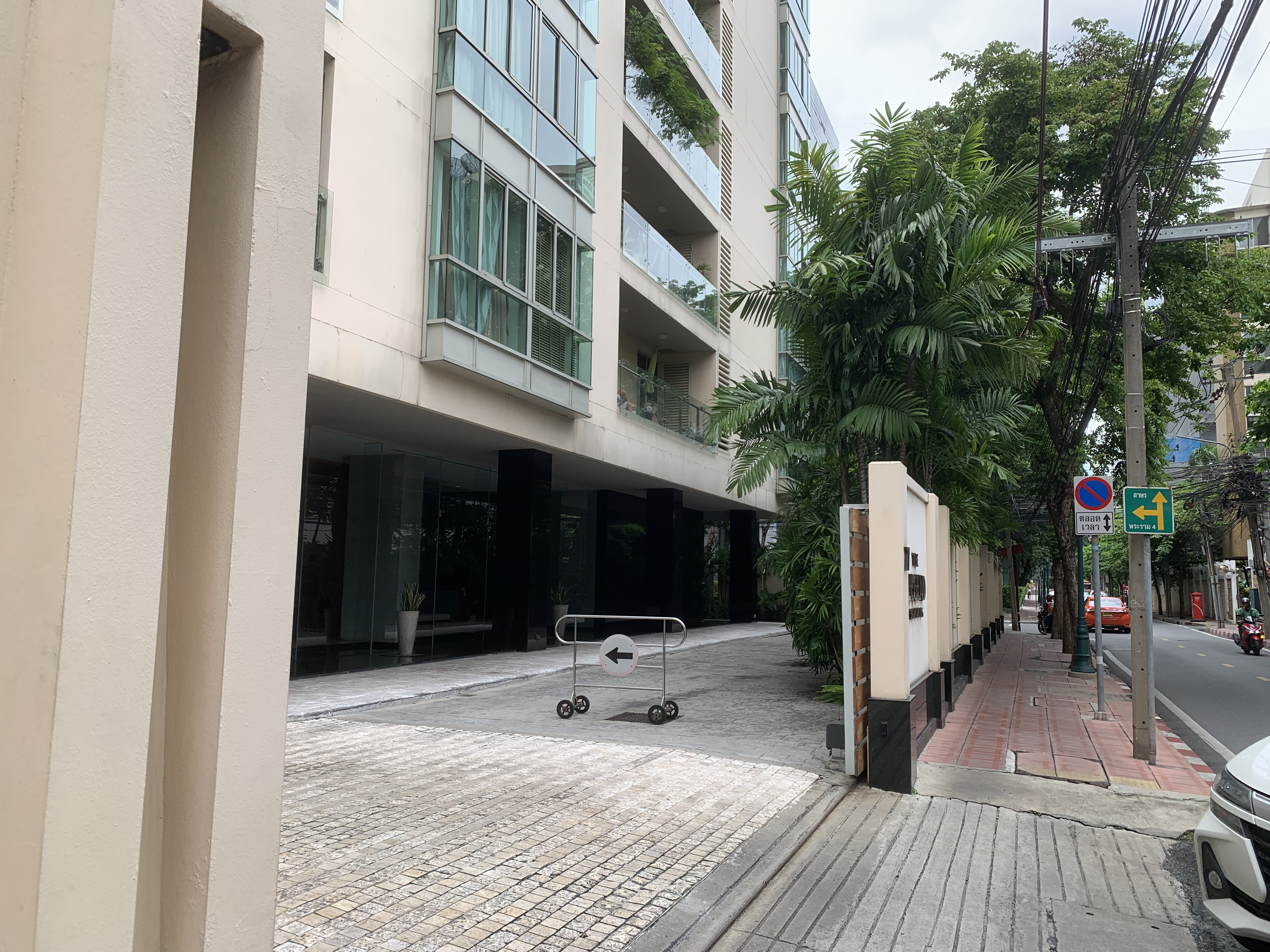
Present-day apartment building The Legend Saladaeng stands where Kanit House, where the couple was based, once stood in Bang Rak, Bangkok.

On the run, Sobhraj financed his lifestyle by posing as either a gem salesman or drug dealer to impress and befriend tourists, whom he defrauded. In India, Sobhraj met Marie-Andrée Leclerc from Lévis, Quebec, a tourist looking for adventure. Dominated by Sobhraj, Leclerc became his most devoted follower, turning a blind eye to his crimes and his philandering with local women.

Sobhraj gathered followers by gaining their loyalty; a typical scam was to help his target out of difficult situations. In one case, he helped two former French policemen, Yannick and Jacques, recover missing passports that Sobhraj himself had actually stolen. In another scheme, Sobhraj provided shelter to a Frenchman, Dominique Renelleau, who appeared to be suffering from dysentery; Sobhraj had actually poisoned him. He was joined by a young Indian man, Ajay Chowdhury, a fellow criminal who became Sobhraj's second-in-command.

Sobhraj and Chowdhury committed their first known murders in 1975. Most of the victims had spent some time with the pair before their deaths and were, according to investigators, recruited by Sobhraj and Chowdhury to join them in their crimes. Sobhraj claimed that most of his murders were accidental drug overdoses of temazepam and heroin, but investigators state that the victims had threatened to expose Sobhraj, which was his motive for murder. The first victim was a young woman from Seattle, Teresa Knowlton (named Jennie Bollivar in the book Serpentine), who was found drowned in a tidal pool in the Gulf of Thailand, wearing a flowered bikini. It was months later that Knowlton's post-mortem, as well as forensic evidence, proved that her drowning, originally believed to be a swimming accident, was murder.

The next victim was a young nomadic Turkish Sephardic Jew, Vitali Hakim, whose burnt body was found on the road to the Pattaya resort, where Sobhraj and his growing clan were staying. Dutch students Henk Bintanja, 29, and his fiancée Cornelia Hemker, 25, were invited to Thailand after meeting Sobhraj in Hong Kong. They, like many others, were poisoned by Sobhraj, who nursed them back to health in order to gain their obedience. As they recovered, Sobhraj was visited by his previous victim Hakim's French girlfriend, Charmayne Carrou, who had come to investigate her boyfriend's disappearance. Fearing exposure, Sobhraj and Chowdhury quickly hustled Bintanja and Hemker out. Their bodies were found strangled and burned on 16 December 1975. Soon after, Carrou was found drowned and wearing a similar-styled swimsuit to that of Sobhraj's earlier victim, Teresa Knowlton. Although the murders of the two women were not connected by investigators at the time, they would later earn Sobhraj the sobriquet "The Bikini Killer".

On 18 December, Sobhraj and Leclerc entered Nepal using the deceased couple's passports. They met in Nepal and, between 21 and 22 December, murdered Canadian Laurent Carrière, 26, and American Connie Jo Bronzich, 29. Sobhraj and Leclerc returned to Thailand, using their latest victims' passports before their bodies could be identified. Upon his return to Thailand, Sobhraj discovered that his three French companions had started to suspect him of serial murder, having found documents belonging to the murder victims. Sobhraj's former companions then fled to Paris after notifying local authorities.

Sobhraj's next destination was either Varanasi or Calcutta, where he murdered Israeli scholar Avoni Jacob to obtain Jacob's passport. Sobhraj used the passport to travel with Leclerc and Chowdhury; first to Singapore, then to India, and, in March 1976, returning to Bangkok, despite knowing that the authorities there sought him. The clan were interrogated by Thai police in connection with the murders but were released.

Meanwhile, Dutch diplomat Herman Knippenberg and his then-wife Angela Kane were investigating the murders of Bintanja and Hemker. Knippenberg had some knowledge of, and had possibly even met, Sobhraj, although the latter's true identity was still unknown to the diplomat, who continued gathering evidence. With the help of Nadine and Remi Gires (Sobhraj's neighbours), Knippenberg built a case against him. He was eventually given police permission to search Sobhraj's apartment a full month after the suspect had left the country. Knippenberg found evidence, including victims' documents and passports, as well as poisons and syringes.

The criminal trio's next stop was Malaysia, where Chowdhury was sent to steal gems. Chowdhury was observed delivering the gems to Sobhraj. This was the last time he was seen; neither Chowdhury nor his remains have been found. It is believed Sobhraj murdered his former accomplice before leaving Malaysia in order to continue his and Leclerc's roles as gem dealers in Geneva. A source later claimed to have sighted Chowdhury in West Germany, but the claim appeared unsubstantiated, so the search for Chowdhury continued.

In May 1976, Interpol issued an international arrest warrant for Sobhraj, which charged him with four murders in Thailand.

Back in Asia, Sobhraj started forming a new criminal group, starting with two Western women, Barbara Smith and Mary Ellen Eather, in Bombay. Sobhraj's next victim was a Frenchman, Jean-Luc Solomon, who was poisoned during a robbery. The act was committed with the intention of incapacitating Solomon, but it killed him.

In July 1976 in New Delhi, Sobhraj, joined by his three-woman criminal clan, tricked a tour group of French post-graduate students into accepting them as tour guides. Sobhraj drugged them by giving them poisoned pills, which he told them were anti-dysentery medicine. When the drugs took effect more quickly than Sobhraj had anticipated, the students began to fall unconscious. Three of the students, realising what Sobhraj had done, overpowered him and contacted the police, leading to his capture. Sobhraj's accomplices, Smith and Eather, confessed during interrogation. Sobhraj was charged with the murder of Solomon and all four were sent to Tihar Jail in New Delhi.

== Imprisonment in India ==
Smith and Eather attempted suicide in prison during the two years before their trial. Sobhraj, who had entered with precious gems concealed in his body and was experienced in bribing captors, was living comfortably in jail. He turned his trial into a spectacle, hiring and firing lawyers at will, bringing in his recently paroled brother André to assist, and eventually going on a hunger strike. He was sentenced to 12 years in prison. Leclerc was found guilty of drugging the French students but was later paroled and returned to Canada when she developed ovarian cancer. She was still claiming her innocence and was reportedly still loyal to Sobhraj when she died at her home in April 1984. She was 38.

Sobhraj's systematic bribery of prison guards at Tihar reached outrageous levels. He led a life of luxury inside the prison, with television and gourmet food, having befriended both guards and prisoners. He gave interviews to Western authors and journalists, such as Oz magazine's Richard Neville in 1977 and Alan Dawson in 1984. Neville was accompanied by his future wife, Julie Clarke, who has frequently written about him. Clarke has said that Sobhraj sold the rights to his life story to a Bangkok businessman, who then sold them to Random House. Because of Neville's hippie trail connections, Random House offered him a contract to go to Delhi to research the case, even though he and Clarke, both journalists in New York City, had no experience in crime reporting. They were out of their depth, having to deal with Sobhraj's 'creepy emissaries,' who kept them under surveillance and arranged for them to visit him in prison, where he described the murders in detail. Clarke was very relieved when they left Delhi.

Although Sobhraj had freely talked to Neville and Clarke about his murders, he later denied everything he had told them, and pretended his actions were in retaliation against "Western imperialism" in Asia.

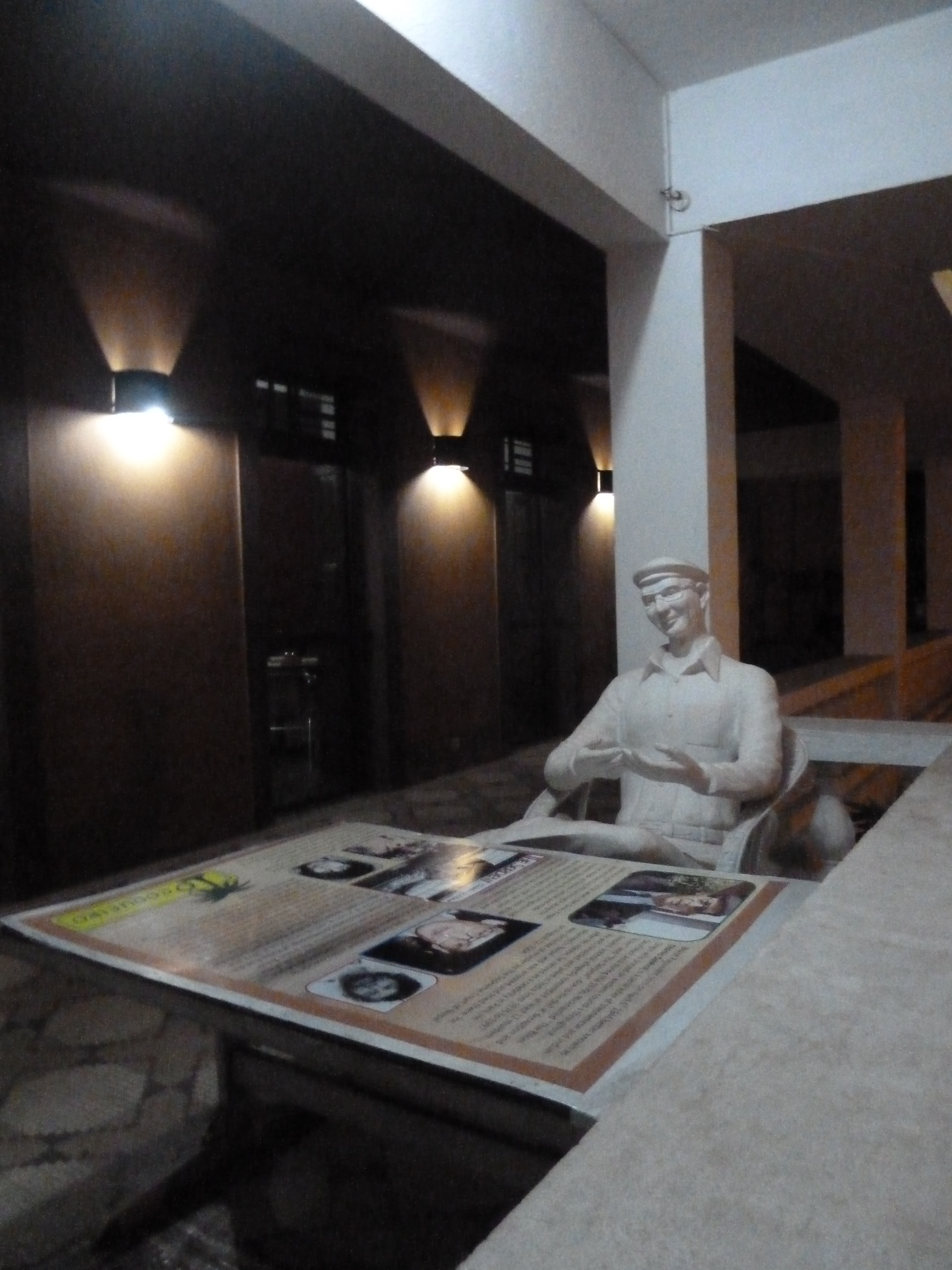
Statue of Sobhraj at O'Coqueiro Restaurant, Porvorim

Sobhraj's prison sentence in India was due to end before the 20-year Thai statute of limitations expired, ensuring his extradition and almost certain execution for murder in Thailand. So in March 1986, in his tenth year in prison, Sobhraj threw a big party for his guards and fellow inmates, drugged them with sleeping pills and walked out of the prison. Inspector Madhukar Zende of the Bombay Police apprehended Sobhraj in O'Coqueiro Restaurant in Goa; his prison sentence was extended by ten years, just as he had hoped. On 17 February 1997, 52-year-old Sobhraj was released with most warrants, evidence, and even witnesses against him long lost. Without any country to extradite him to, Indian authorities let him return to France.

== Imprisonment in Nepal ==
Sobhraj retired to a comfortable life in suburban Paris. He charged large sums of money for interviews and photographs. The rights to a film based on his life were sold for over US$15 million.

In 2003, Sobhraj returned to Nepal, one of the few countries where he could still be arrested and where he was still eagerly sought by authorities. According to The Himalayan Times, Sobhraj had returned to Kathmandu to set up a mineral water business. His return is thought to have been the result of his yearning for attention and overconfidence in his own intellect.

On 1 September 2003, Sobhraj was spotted by a journalist for The Himalayan Times in a casino in Kathmandu. The journalist followed him for two weeks and wrote a news report in The Himalayan Times with photographs. The Nepalese police saw the report, raided the casino and arrested an unaware Sobhraj, who was still gambling there. The police reopened the double murder case from 1975. On 20 August 2004, Sobhraj was sentenced to life imprisonment by the Kathmandu district court for the 1975 murder of Connie Jo Bronzich.

Most of the photocopy evidence used against him in this case had been gathered by Knippenberg, the Dutch diplomat, his then-wife Angela Kane and Interpol. Sobhraj appealed against the conviction, claiming he had been sentenced without trial. His lawyer announced that Chantal Compagnon, Sobhraj's wife in France, was filing a case before the European Court of Human Rights against the French government for refusing to provide him with any assistance.

On 7 July 2008, issuing a press release through his fiancée Biswas, Sobhraj claimed he was never convicted of murder by any court, and asked the media not to refer to him as a serial killer.

It was claimed that Sobhraj married his fiancée on 9 October 2008 in prison during the Bada Dashami festival. The following day, Nepalese authorities dismissed the claim of his marriage. They said that Biswas and her family had been allowed to conduct a tika ceremony, along with the relatives of hundreds of other prisoners. They further claimed that it was not a wedding but part of the ongoing Dashain festival when elders put the vermilion mark on the foreheads of those younger than them to signify their blessings.

In July 2010, the Supreme Court of Nepal postponed the verdict on an appeal filed by Sobhraj against a district court's verdict sentencing him to life imprisonment for the murder of American backpacker Connie Jo Bronzich in 1975. Sobhraj had appealed against the Kathmandu district court's verdict in 2006, calling it unfair.

On 30 July 2010, the Supreme Court upheld the life sentence issued by the district court for the murder of Connie Jo Bronzich, plus another year and a Rs 2,000 fine for entering Nepal illegally. The seizure of all Sobhraj's properties was also ordered by the court. Sobhraj's supposed wife Biswas and mother-in-law Shakuntala Thapa, a lawyer, expressed dissatisfaction with the verdict, with Thapa claiming that Sobhraj had been denied justice and that the "judiciary is corrupt". They were charged and sent to judicial custody for contempt of court because of these remarks.

On 18 September 2014, Sobhraj was convicted in the Bhaktapur district court of the 1975 murder of Canadian tourist Laurent Carrière, and sentenced to 20 years in prison. In 2018, Sobhraj was in critical condition and had received several open-heart surgeries and was scheduled for more.

On 21 December 2022, the Supreme Court of Nepal ordered his release from prison because of old age, after serving 19 years of his prison term. He was ordered to leave the country within 15 days. On 23 December 2022, he was released from prison on account of his age and good behaviour. He was deported to France and will not be able to return to Nepal for at least 10 years.

== Personal life ==
In 2008, he married his Indian-Nepali interpreter, Nihita Biswas, in prison. The daughter of his lawyer, she was 20 years old and 44 years his junior. One of the prison staff told Paris Match in 2021: "It's a legend; there is no proof of their union". She told the media that his gaze and his eyes were mesmerizing and that his French charm had done everything. In 2017, she donated blood to save him during an open-heart operation.

== Portrayal ==
Sobhraj has been the subject of three non-fiction books, Serpentine (1979) by Thomas Thompson, The Life and Crimes of Charles Sobhraj (1980) by Richard Neville and Julie Clarke, and the section titled "The Bikini Murders" by Noel Barber in the Reader's Digest collection Great Cases of Interpol (1982). Neville and Clarke's book was the basis for a 1989 made-for-TV film, Shadow of the Cobra.

The 2015 Hindi film Main Aur Charles, directed by Prawaal Raman and Cyznoure Network, is reportedly based on Charles Sobhraj's escape from Tihar Jail in New Delhi. The film was initially produced by Pooja Bhatt, but due to disagreements during the shoot, Bhatt left the film.

An eight-part BBC-commissioned miniseries called The Serpent was broadcast in the UK in January 2021, starring Tahar Rahim as Sobhraj, before being streamed on Netflix in April 2021.

Netflix released Black Warrant based on a book by the same name in January 2025 where Sidhant Gupta played the role of Charles Sobhraj.

A parody film titled Inspector Zende based on Sobhraj and starring Manoj Bajpai and Jim Sarbh was released on Netflix on 5th September 2025.
