= Alzheimer's Drug Discovery Foundation =

Nonprofit organization

The Alzheimer's Drug Discovery Foundation
- Founders: Leonard A. Lauder, Ronald S. Lauder, and Dr. Howard Fillit
- Purpose: The mission of the Alzheimer's Drug Discovery Foundation is to rapidly accelerate the development of drugs to prevent, treat and cure Alzheimer's disease.
- Location: New York, NY
- Website: Official website

The Alzheimer's Drug Discovery Foundation (ADDF) is a nonprofit organization founded in 1998 by co-chairmen Leonard A. Lauder and Ronald S. Lauder of the Estée Lauder Companies cosmetics family and Howard Fillit, a geriatrician and neuroscientist. Isobel Coleman serves as the organization's Chief Executive Officer. The ADDF provides funding to scientists who are conducting promising, innovative Alzheimer's disease drug research worldwide. The ADDF funds early-stage research and early-phase clinical trials that might otherwise go unfunded. By supporting research projects around the world, it seeks to increase the chances of finding treatments for Alzheimer's disease, related dementias and cognitive aging.

The ADDF has invested over $400 million to fund some 792 Alzheimer's drug discovery, development, biomarker, and prevention programs in academic centers and biotechnology companies in 21 countries. From 2000 to 2004, the ADDF provided seed funding for Amyvid, the first FDA-approved diagnostic test for Alzheimer's disease. The ADDF also funded PrecivityAD, the first blood test to help diagnose Alzheimer's disease.

== Funding model ==
The ADDF is a biomedical venture philanthropy. Many of its grants are structured as investments, providing a return that is reinvested in new drug research. After initial ADDF funding, grantees have received commitments of over $2 billion in follow-on funding from government, pharmaceutical companies and venture capital firms to further advance drug research.

== ADDF programs ==
=== Partnership Programs ===
The ADDF partners with family foundations, government, non-profit organization, the pharmaceutical industry and corporate organizations to leverage collective funding power.

=== Scientific Conferences ===
The ADDF sponsors a number of scientific conferences, including the International Conference on Alzheimer's and Parkinson’s Disease (AD/PD), the Clinical Trials on Alzheimer’s Disease conference (CTAD), and the World Dementia Council Summit. The ADDF also organizes advisory panels focused on key issues surrounding drug discovery and development for Alzheimer's.

=== Cognitive Vitality ===
The ADDF's microsite, Cognitive Vitality, provide evidence-based answers to pressing questions about healthy brain aging. Resources include:

- Expert ratings of scientific evidence for and against suggested cognitive vitality strategies including: health management and drugs; nutrition and supplements; and environmental and physical considerations
- Practical information on safety, efficacy and drug dosage
- Digestible translations of scientific findings

== Awards ==
=== Melvin R. Goodes Prize for Excellence in Drug Development ===
The Melvin R. Goodes Prize for Excellence in Drug Development, also known simply as the Goodes Prize, was first awarded in 2015. It is awarded annually by the Alzheimer’s Drug Discovery Foundation for innovations in research that have made a significant and lasting impact in the Alzheimer’s field. Recipients receive an engraved medal and a monetary award of $150,000 to support their continued research in Alzheimer’s therapeutics, biomarkers, or prevention programs.

The award is named in honor of Melvin R. Goodes, a former Chairman and Chief Executive of Warner-Lambert. Goodes established the prize with his wife, Nancy, and in partnership with the Alzheimer’s Drug Discovery Foundation after his own diagnosis with Alzheimer’s disease in 2009.

== Events ==
Every year, the ADDF hosts a series of events to raise awareness and funds to support Alzheimer's research and drug development. They include:

- The Hope on the Horizon Palm Beach event, which honors an Alzheimer’s advocate who has helped to advance the ADDF’s mission.
- Tomorrow’s Breakthroughs Today, a Palm Beach-based scientific symposium series that highlights three scientists sharing updates on the latest Alzheimer’s research advances each year.
- Memories Matter, an evening focused on the ways in which scientific advances are bringing hope to the Alzheimer’s community.
- The Great Ladies Luncheon and Fashion Show, an annual spring runway show and lunch recognizing female advocates in Alzheimer's. Previous events have included designs and special appearances by Erdem, Jason Wu and Carolina Herrera.
- The Connoisseur's Dinner, an evening of art and wine celebrating scientific progress in Alzheimer's research.
- The Fall Symposium and Luncheon, a luncheon and learning event featuring a keynote speech or panel highlighting progress in cognitive decline research and drug development.
- House of Purple, an event presented by the ADDF’s Young Professionals Committee which highlights the next generation of Alzheimer's advocates.
- The ADDF Scientific Summit, which convenes the ADDF’s Goodes Prize recipients and other voices in the Alzheimer’s field to discuss research advances. The inaugural Summit featured an address from Dr. Sanjay Gupta.
