= Movses Abelian =

Armenian-Georgian diplomat and United Nations official

United Nations Under-Secretary-General for General Assembly and Conference Management
- In office 1 September 2019 – Incumbent
- Preceded by: Catherine Pollard

United Nations Assistant Secretary-General for General Assembly and Conference Management
- In office 2016–2019
- Preceded by: Catherine Pollard
- Succeeded by: Cherith Norman Chalet

Permanent Representative of Armenia to the United Nations
- In office 1998–2003

Personal details
- Children: 2

Movses Abelian is an Armenian diplomat who has served as Under-Secretary-General for General Assembly and Conference Management and Coordinator for Multilingualism in the United Nations Secretariat since 2019.

== Education and early career ==
Abelian was educated in Armenia, Russia and the United States of America. He was an associate professor at Yerevan State University from 1989 to 1992 before joining the Ministry of Foreign Affairs of Armenia.

== Diplomatic and international roles ==
In 1996 Abelian was appointed Deputy Permanent Representative of Armenia to the United Nations, and later served as Ambassador and Permanent Representative from 1998 to 2003. During his tenure he held roles as chair of the General Assembly's Fifth Committee in 1998, vice-chair of the United Nations Disarmament Commission in 2000, president of the Executive Board of UNICEF in 2001 and facilitator for United Nations reform in 2002.

After becoming a United Nations official, Abelian served as director of the Security Council Affairs Division from 2011 to 2016 before being appointed Assistant Secretary-General for General Assembly and Conference Management. He succeeded Catherine Pollard as Under-Secretary-General for General Assembly and Conference Management and Coordinator for Multilingualism in 2019.

== Personal life ==
Abelian is married and has two children.
