= Kim Won-soo =

South Korean diplomat (born 1956)

- 김원수
- Born: South Korea
- Education: Seoul National University
- Occupations: Disarmament officer and Under-Secretary-General of United Nations

Korean name
- Hangul: 김원수
- Hanja: 金垣洙
- RR: Gim Wonsu
- MR: Kim Wŏnsu

Kim Won-soo (Korean: 김원수; Hanja: 金垣洙; born 1956) is a South Korean diplomat and a former Under-Secretary-General and High Representative for Disarmament Affairs. Prior to that assignment, he served as a Special Advisor to the Secretary-General of the United Nations since 2007.

== Early life ==
Kim joined the Ministry of Foreign Affairs in 1978 and has served in various capacities, including overseas posting at Korean embassies in the United States and India.

From 1996 to 1997, he was Alternative Representative and Coordinator of the Republic of Korea to the United Nations Security Council as well as Political Counselor to the country's Permanent Mission to the United Nations.

From 2000 to 2002, he was Secretary for International Security Affairs in the Office of the President of the Republic of Korea. In the following year, he served as Secretary for Foreign Affairs and Trade.

Between 2004 and 2005, he was Director-General for Policy Planning and Ambassador for Regional Security Cooperation in the Ministry of Foreign Affairs. Then he became Special Adviser to the Foreign Minister and Ambassador for UN issues in 2006.

Prior to his appointment to the United Nations, he served as Ambassador of South Korea from October to December 2007.

== Career ==
Kim was one of the most influential advisors to UN Secretary-General Ban Ki-moon and widely considered his right-hand man. He is appointed as Under-Secretary-General and Acting High Representative for Disarmament Affairs since June 2015, and has since led efforts to investigate chemical weapon attacks in Syria and dismantle the chemical weapons stockpile. In a recent address marking the coinciding 70th anniversary of the UN and 70th anniversary of the first and last use of nuclear weapons in war, Kim outlined goals to address the urgent issue of nuclear disarmament as well as sustainable development related to climate concerns.

On the Koreas, he suggests that North Korean provocations ought to be stopped, yet the United Nations leave a door open should the North Korean stance reverses.

== Education ==
Kim holds a Bachelor of Law from Seoul National University in Korea and a Master of Arts from the Paul H. Nitze School of Advanced International Studies at Johns Hopkins University, United States. He was also a visiting fellow at Stanford University.

== Personal life ==
He is married with two sons.
