= Sérgio de Queiroz Duarte =

Brazilian diplomat (1934–2024)

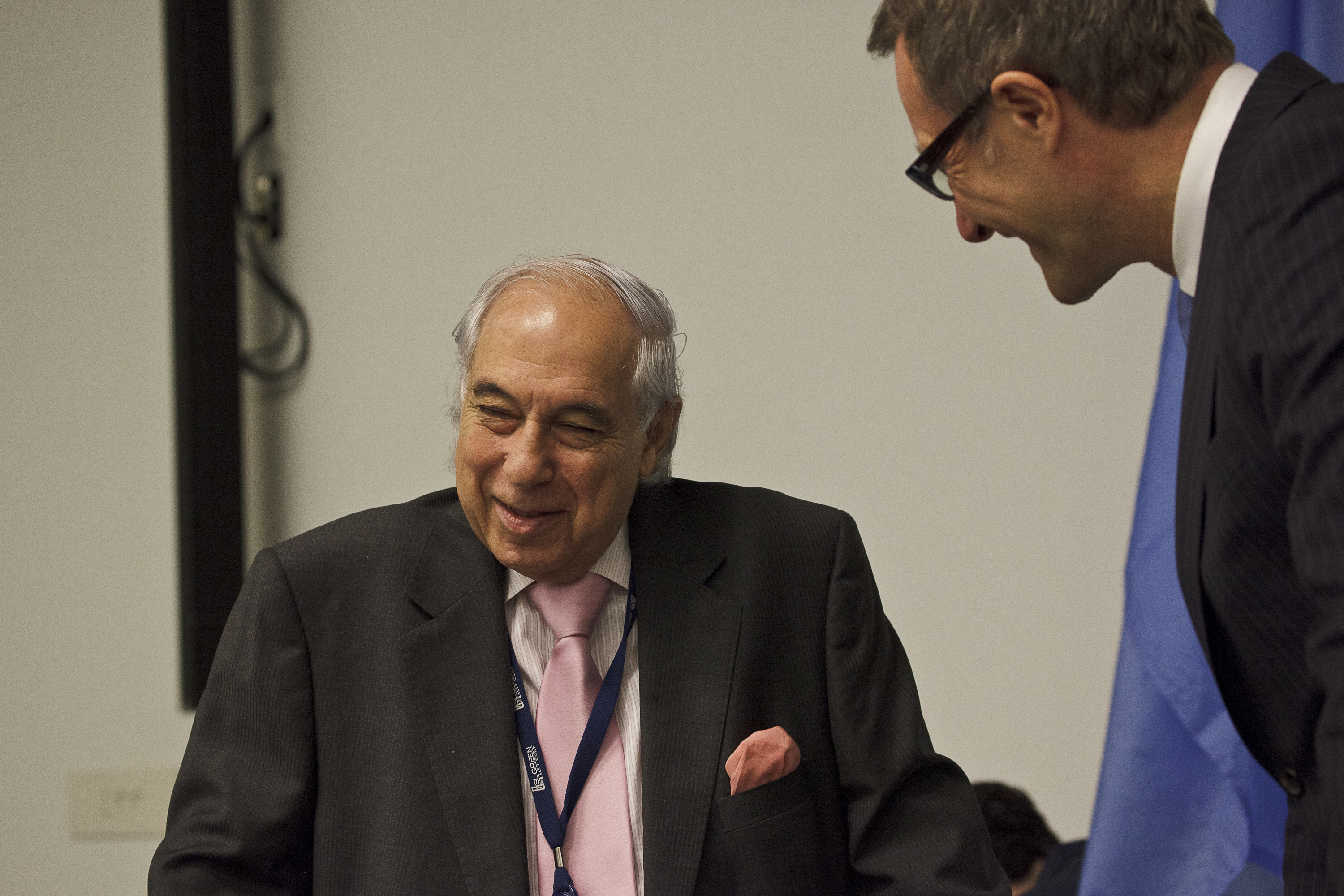
- Duarte in 2011

Personal details
- Born: Sérgio de Queiroz Duarte; 1934 Rio de Janeiro, Brazil
- Died: July 2024 (aged 89–90) Belo Horizonte, Minas Gerais, Brazil
- Education: Escola Brasileira de Administração Pública e de Empresas; Fluminense Federal University

Sérgio de Queiroz Duarte (1934 – July 2024) was a Brazilian career diplomat. His last position was as United Nations High Representative for Disarmament Affairs, with the United Nations Office for Disarmament Affairs. He was appointed by UN Secretary-General Ban Ki-moon in July 2007 and retired in February 2012. Duarte served as President of the Pugwash Conferences on Science and World Affairs.

== Life and career ==
Born in Rio de Janeiro, Duarte served the Brazilian Foreign Service for 48 years. He was the Ambassador of Brazil in a number of countries, including Austria, Croatia, Slovakia and Slovenia concurrently (1999–2002), China (1996–1999), Canada (1993–1996) and Nicaragua (1986–1991). He also served in Switzerland (1979–1986), the United States (1970–1974), Argentina (1963–1966) and Rome (1961–1963).

In addition, he has been posted as the Brazilian representative to several international organizations, focusing on disarmament issues. In 2005, he was the President of the 2005 Seventh Review Conference of the Parties to the Treaty on the Non-Proliferation of Nuclear Weapons. From 2000 to 2002, he was the Governor for Brazil at the Board of Governors of the International Atomic Energy Agency (IAEA). From 1999 to 2000, he was the chairman of the Board of Governors of the IAEA. From 1979 to 1986, he served as Alternate Representative of Brazil in the Office of the Special Representative of Brazil for Disarmament Affairs in Geneva. He was also posted to the Permanent Mission to the United Nations in Geneva from 1966 to 1968.

Duarte obtained his Bachelor of Law from Fluminense Federal University (Niterói, Rio de Janeiro) in 1958. He held a B.A. from the Brazilian School of Public Administration and he studied in the Brazilian Diplomatic Academy from 1956 to 1957. He was married and had two grown children. He died in July 2024.

== Sources ==
- The Biography of Sérgio de Queiroz Duarte, UN
