= Under-Secretary-General of the United Nations =

Senior official in the United Nations

- Emblem of the United Nations

- Flag of the United Nations

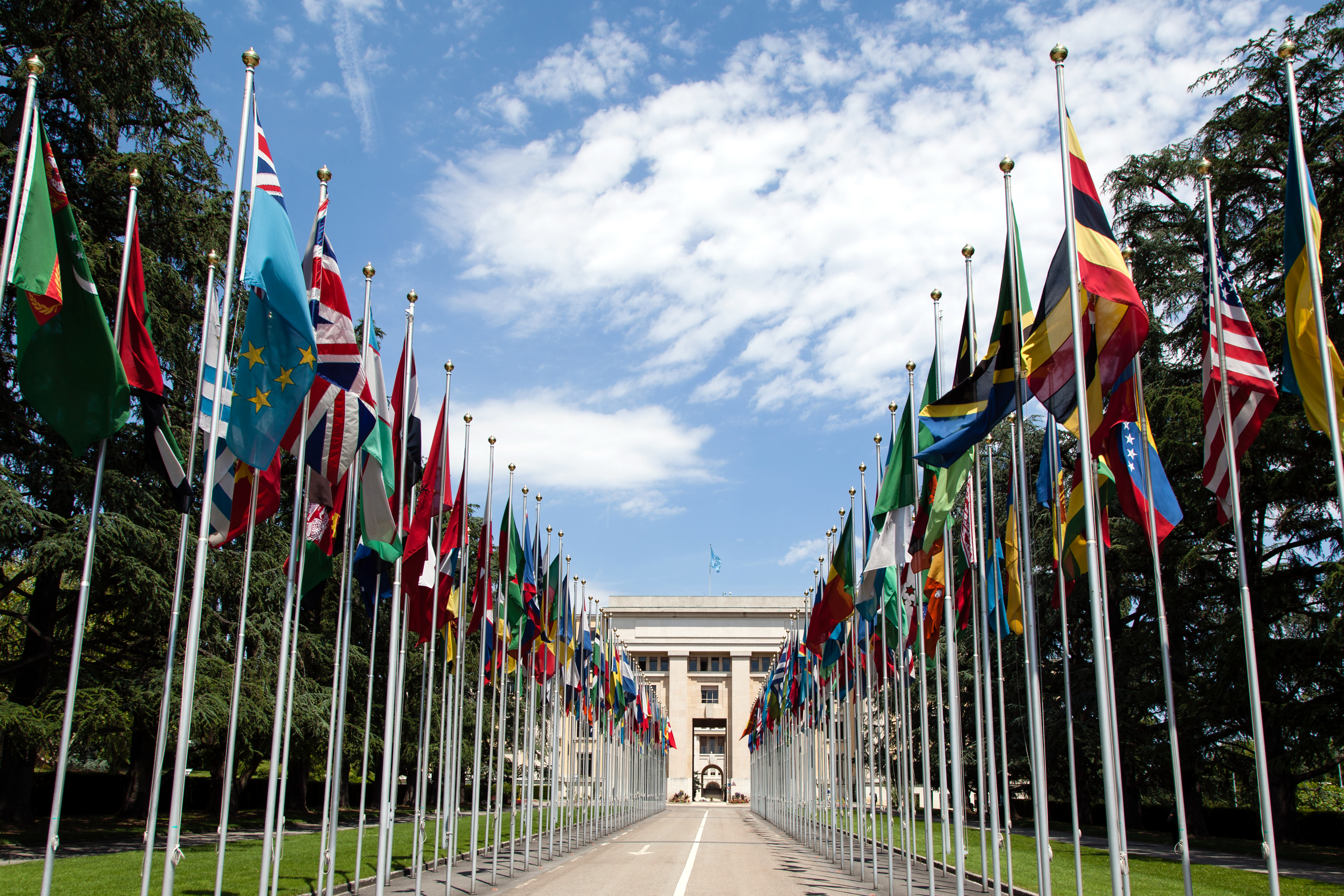
- Style: His/Her Excellency
- Constituting instrument: United Nations Charter
- Website: un.org/

An under-secretary-general of the United Nations (USG) is a senior official within the United Nations System, normally appointed by the General Assembly on the recommendation of the secretary-general for a renewable term of four years. Under-secretary-general is the third highest rank in the United Nations, after the secretary-general and the deputy secretary-general. The rank is held by the heads of different UN entities, certain high officials of the United Nations Secretariat, and high-level envoys. The United Nations regards the rank as equal to that of a cabinet minister of a member state, and under-secretaries-general have diplomatic immunity under the UN Charter.

== Appointment and accountability ==
The majority of USGs are appointed by the General Assembly on the recommendation of the secretary-general for a fixed term of four years. Others (normally special envoys, Secretariat-appointees and non-programme management positions) are appointed directly by the UN secretary-general on their own authority. However, all USGs report to the General Assembly through the secretary-general. The only exception to this is the under-secretary-general for internal oversight services, who reports directly to the General Assembly.

The distinction in method of appointment is important as USGs appointed by the General Assembly have a mandate independent of the secretary-general, and therefore is unable to remove them from office without the General Assembly's consent. This restriction has been seen by many commentators to weaken the secretary-general's ability to provide strong leadership and management within the United Nations System.

== Equivalent rank ==
Some senior posts within the UN System have the equivalent rank of under-secretary-general but are either not entitled or choose not to use the formal title. The most prominent example of this is the administrator of the United Nations Development Programme, who is often referred to as the third most senior official within the UN System yet does not use the title of under-secretary-general. The UN high commissioner for human rights also has the rank of under-secretary-general, yet does not use the title.

== Diplomatic rank ==
USGs have diplomatic rank equivalent to that of a national cabinet minister. Under Article 105 of the United Nations Charter they have diplomatic immunity.

== Senior Management Group (SMG) ==
With over 50 people with the rank of under-secretary-general, unsurprisingly the influence and power they wield within the UN System varies dramatically. The most important USGs, controlling budgets, programmes or key activities, are also members of the United Nations Senior Management Group, whose objective is to ensure strategic coherence and direction in the work of the organization. The cabinet was approved by the General Assembly in 1997 as part of the reform proposal submitted by Secretary-General Kofi Annan.

== List of under-secretaries-general ==
The following is a list of under-secretaries-general or those with equivalent rank. This list is not exhaustive. Members of the SMG are indicated by an asterisk (*).

=== Programmes and commissions ===
- Volker Türk * – High Commissioner, United Nations Office of the High Commissioner for Human Rights (OHCHR)
- Jorge Moreira da Silva – Executive Director of United Nations Office for Project Services (UNOPS)
- Monica Juma * – Director-General, United Nations Office at Vienna and Chief Executive, United Nations Office on Drugs and Crime (UNODC)
- Sima Sami Bahous * – Under-Secretary-General, executive director of UN Women
- Winnie Byanyima – Executive Director, Joint United Nations Programme on HIV/AIDS (UNAIDS)
- Doreen Bogdan-Martin – Secretary-General International Telecommunication Union
- Seizo ONOE – Director, ITU Telecommunication Standardization Bureau (ITU-T)
- Rebeca Grynspan * – United Nations Conference on Trade and Development (UNCTAD)
- Alexander De Croo * – Administrator, United Nations Development Programme (UNDP), also Vice-Chair of the United Nations Sustainable Development Group
- Claver Gatate * – Executive Secretary, United Nations Economic Commission for Africa (UNECA)
- Tatiana Molcean * – United Nations Economic Commission for Europe (UNECE)
- Rania Al-Mashat * – Under Secretary General United Nations Economic and Social Commission for Western Asia (UNESCWA)
- Armida Alisjahbana * – United Nations Economic and Social Commission for Asia and the Pacific (UNESCAP)
- Diene Keita * – Executive Director, United Nations Population Fund (UNFPA)
- Inger Andersen * – Executive Director, United Nations Environment Programme (UNEP)
- Anacláudia Rossbach * – Executive Director, United Nations Human Settlements Programme (UN-HABITAT)
- Barham Salih* – United Nations High Commissioner for Refugees (UNHCR)
- Catherine M. Russell * – United Nations Children's Fund (UNICEF)
- Tshilidzi Marwala * – Rector, United Nations University (UNU)
- Benedicta Neysa Nathania - Coordinator of Adaptation Academy (UNFCCC - UNHREP), Director-General of UNHREP (UN Human Rights Educational Project) (with Sergio Vieira de Mello, posthumous)
- Luke J. Lindberg * – Executive Director, World Food Programme (WFP)

=== Secretariat officials ===
- Chaloka Beyani * – Under-Secretary-General and Special Adviser of the Secretary-General for the Prevention of Genocide (OSAPG)
- Roland Mollerus – High Representative for LDCs, LLDCs and SIDS
- Pramila Patten * – Under-Secretary-General and Special Representative of the Secretary-General on Sexual Violence in Conflict
- Jeanine Hennis-Plasschaert * – Under-Secretary-General for Safety and Security
- Rosemary DiCarlo * – Under-Secretary-General for Political Affairs
- Atul Khare – Under-Secretary-General for Department of Operational Support
- Izumi Nakamitsu * – Under-Secretary-General, High Representative for Disarmament Affairs
- Jean-Pierre Lacroix * – Under-Secretary-General for Peacekeeping Operations
- Thomas Fletcher * – Under-Secretary-General for Humanitarian Affairs and Emergency Relief Coordinator
- Augustine P. Mahiga * – Under-Secretary-General, Mediator-in-Residence, DPA's Mediator Debriefing and Lessons Learned Programme
- Courtenay Rattray * – Under-Secretary-General, Chef de Cabinet
- Fatoumata Ndiaye * – Under-Secretary-General for Internal Oversight Services
- Tatiana Valovaya * – Director-General of the United Nations Office at Geneva
- Catherine Pollard * – Under-Secretary-General Department of Management Strategy, Policy and Compliance
- Movses Abelian * – Under-Secretary-General Department for General Assembly and Conference Management
- Melissa Fleming * – Under-Secretary-General for Global Communications
- Elinor Hammarskjöld * – Under-Secretary-General and Legal Counsel
- Li Junhua * – Under-Secretary-General for Economic and Social Affairs
- Vaneessa Frazier – Special Representative for Children and Armed Conflict
- Zainab Hawa Bangura – Director-General of the United Nations Office at Nairobi
- Alexandre Zouev* – Acting Under-Secretary-General and United Nations Office of Counter-Terrorism
- Miguel Ángel Moratinos – Under-Secretary-General and High Representative for the United Nations Alliance of Civilizations (UNAOC)

=== Advisers ===
- Chaloka Beyani * – Under-Secretary-General, Special Adviser to the Secretary-General on the Prevention of Genocide
- Philippe Douste-Blazy – Special Adviser to the Secretary-General on Innovative Financing for Development
- Paul Farmer * – Special Adviser to the Secretary-General for community-based medicine and lessons from Haiti
- Ahunna Eziakonwa * – Under-Secretary-General, Special Adviser on Africa
- Nicolas Michel * – Special Adviser to the Secretary-General and Mediator in the border dispute between Equatorial Guinea and Gabon
- Mô Bleeker– Special Adviser to the Secretary-General on the Responsibility to Protect (since 2024)
- Wilfried Lemke – Special Adviser to the Secretary-General on Sport for Development and Peace (2008–2016)

=== Special envoys ===
- Gordon Brown * - Special Envoy for Global Education
- María Angela Holguín Cuéllar * – Special Envoy to the Secretary-General on Cyprus (2025-)
- Julie Bishop * – Special Envoy to the Secretary-General on Myanmar (2012–2016)
- Ray Chambers * - Special Envoy for Malaria
- Michel Kazatchkine * - Special Envoy for HIV/AIDS in Eastern Europe and Central Asia
- Guang Cong * - Special Envoy of the Secretary-General for the Horn of Africa
- Parfait Onanga-Anyanga * - Special Representative, Head of United Nations Office to the African Union
- Matthew Nimetz * - Under-Secretary-General, Personal Envoy of the Secretary-General for the Greece-FYROM Talks(1991-2019)
- Mary Robinson - Special Envoy on Climate Change
- Terje Rød-Larsen * - Special Envoy of the Secretary-General for the implementation of Security Council resolution 1559/2004
- Jacques Rogge * - Special Envoy of the Secretary-General for Youth Refugees and Sport
- Leonardo Santos Simão * - Special Envoy of the Secretary-General for Western Sahara and the Sahel
- Retno Marsudi - Special Envoy of the Secretary-General on Water

== Other senior UN positions ==
=== Deputy secretary-general ===
The deputy secretary-general is the second highest-ranking official in the UN System after the secretary-general. Amina Mohammed is the current office holder.

=== Assistant secretary-general ===
An assistant secretary-general sits beneath an under-secretary-general within the UN hierarchy. Assistant secretaries-general are often deputies within departments or programmes, reporting to their respective under-secretary-general and through him or her to the UN secretary-general.
