= Assistant Secretary of Defense for Global Strategic Affairs =

The Assistant Secretary of Defense for Global Strategic Affairs, or ASD(GSA), is a position in the Office of the Secretary of Defense that develops policy for the Secretary on countering weapons of mass destruction, nuclear forces and missile defense, cyber security and space issues. ASD(GSA) is currently tasked with three major congressionally mandated reviews: the Nuclear Posture Review, the Ballistic Missile Defense Review, and the Space Posture Review. In addition, GSA is the Defense Department's lead in developing the DoD's cybersecurity strategy, and for crafting the policy for the standup of the new Cyber Command. ASD(GSA) answers to the Under Secretary of Defense for Policy. Although ASD(GSA) is a recently configured office, its functional responsibilities can be traced back in part to a position eliminated in early 2008, the 'Assistant Secretary of Defense for International Security Policy'

The office also directs the Defense Technology Security Administration.

== History ==
The ASD(GSA) can trace its origins partially back to a related office, the Assistant Secretary of Defense for International Security Policy, or ASD(ISP). This position was created in 1981, and through the end of the George H. W. Bush administration was responsible for all political-military activity involving NATO, other European countries, and the USSR, responsibilities now under the Assistant Secretary of Defense for International Security Affairs. The exact title and responsibilities of the ASD(ISP) have changed over time, but the office typically dealt with nuclear counterproliferation, arms control and space policy. For example, in March 2005, DoD Directive 5111.14 designated the ASD(ISP) as "the principal advisor to the Secretary of Defense and the Under Secretary of Defense for Policy (USD(P)) on political/military policy and issues of DOD interest that relate to select foreign regions and nations and to the functional areas of arms control, space, technology and information security, nonproliferation and counterproliferation."

According to his NATO biography, Peter Flory, who held the position of ASD(ISP) from mid-2005 to late 2006, "served as the principal advisor to the Under Secretary of Defense for Policy and the Secretary of Defense on nonproliferation and counterproliferation, security cooperation with nations of Europe, Eurasia, and the North Atlantic Treaty Organization; oversight over the Cooperative Threat Reduction Program and arms control negotiations; and policy for nuclear and advanced non-nuclear deterrent forces, space-related capabilities, and ballistic missile defenses."

Following Flory's departure, ASD(ISP) appears to have been scrapped, since no further appointees have been made to that position. In 2008, a new post, the Assistant Secretary of Defense for Global Security Affairs was created within USD(P). The Global Security Affairs office was responsible for defense-related issues concerning building the capability of partners and allies; coalition affairs; technology security policy; security cooperation; counternarcotics, counterproliferation, and countering global threats; detainee affairs; and POW/MIA issues.

Under the Obama administration, ASD for Global Security Affairs was retitled Assistant Secretary of Defense for Global Strategic Affairs, or ASD(GSA). With respect to regional defense policy toward Europe and Eurasia, the ASD(ISP)'s responsibilities seem to have been absorbed by the ASD(ISA) and Assistant Secretary of Defense for Asian & Pacific Security Affairs, respectively. Meanwhile, the ASD(GSA) is now largely responsible for the functional elements of the ASD(ISP)'s former portfolio, including countering Weapons of Mass Destruction, nuclear & missile defense policy, and space policy, in addition to the new responsibility of cyber policy.

== Defense Technology Security Administration ==
The Defense Technology Security Administration (DTSA) creates and enforces Department of Defense technology security policies related to international transfers of defense-related goods, services, and technologies. DTSA authorizes foreign access to U.S. military technology or foreign purchases of American companies. DTSA also serves as a reviewing agency for the export licensing of dual-use commodities and provides technical and policy assessments on export license applications.

As of October 1, 2013 the DTSA director is Beth M. McCormick.

== Office holders ==
Assistant Secretaries of Defense (International Security Policy)
Name	Tenure	SecDef(s) Served Under	President(s) Served Under
Assistant Secretary of Defense (International Security Policy)
Richard N. Perle	August 5, 1981 – May 8, 1987	Caspar W. Weinberger	Ronald Reagan
Frank J. Gaffney, Jr. (Acting)	May 8, 1987 – November 1987	Caspar W. Weinberger	Ronald Reagan
Ronald F. Lehman	February 18, 1988 – May 11, 1989	Frank C. Carlucci III; William H. Taft IV (Acting); Richard B. Cheney	Ronald Reagan; George H. W. Bush
Stephen J. Hadley	June 23, 1989 – January 20, 1993	Richard B. Cheney	George H. W. Bush
Assistant Secretary of Defense (Nuclear Security and Counterproliferation)
Ashton B. Carter	June 30, 1993 – June 13, 1994	Leslie Aspin, Jr. William J. Perry	William Clinton
Assistant Secretary of Defense (International Security Policy)
Ashton B. Carter	June 13, 1994 – September 14, 1996	William J. Perry	William Clinton
Franklin C. Miller (Acting)	September 14, 1996 – 1998	William J. Perry; William S. Cohen	William Clinton
Position Vacant	1998–2001	William S. Cohen	William Clinton
J.D. Crouch II	August 6, 2001 – October 31, 2003	Donald H. Rumsfeld	George W. Bush
Peter C. W. Flory	August 2, 2005 – December 1, 2006	Donald H. Rumsfeld	George W. Bush
Assistant Secretary of Defense (Global Security Affairs)
Joseph A. Benkert	July 23, 2008 – January 20, 2009	Robert M. Gates	George W. Bush
Assistant Secretary of Defense (Global Strategic Affairs)
Michael Nacht	May 7, 2009 – May 20, 2010	Robert M. Gates	Barack Obama
Kenneth Handelman (Acting)	May 21, 2010 – August 1, 2011	Robert M. Gates; Leon E. Panetta	Barack Obama
Madelyn R. Creedon	August 2, 2011 – July 23, 2014	Leon E. Panetta	Barack Obama

== See also ==
- Assistant Secretary of Defense for International Security Affairs
