= Ash Carter =

American government official and academic (1954–2022)

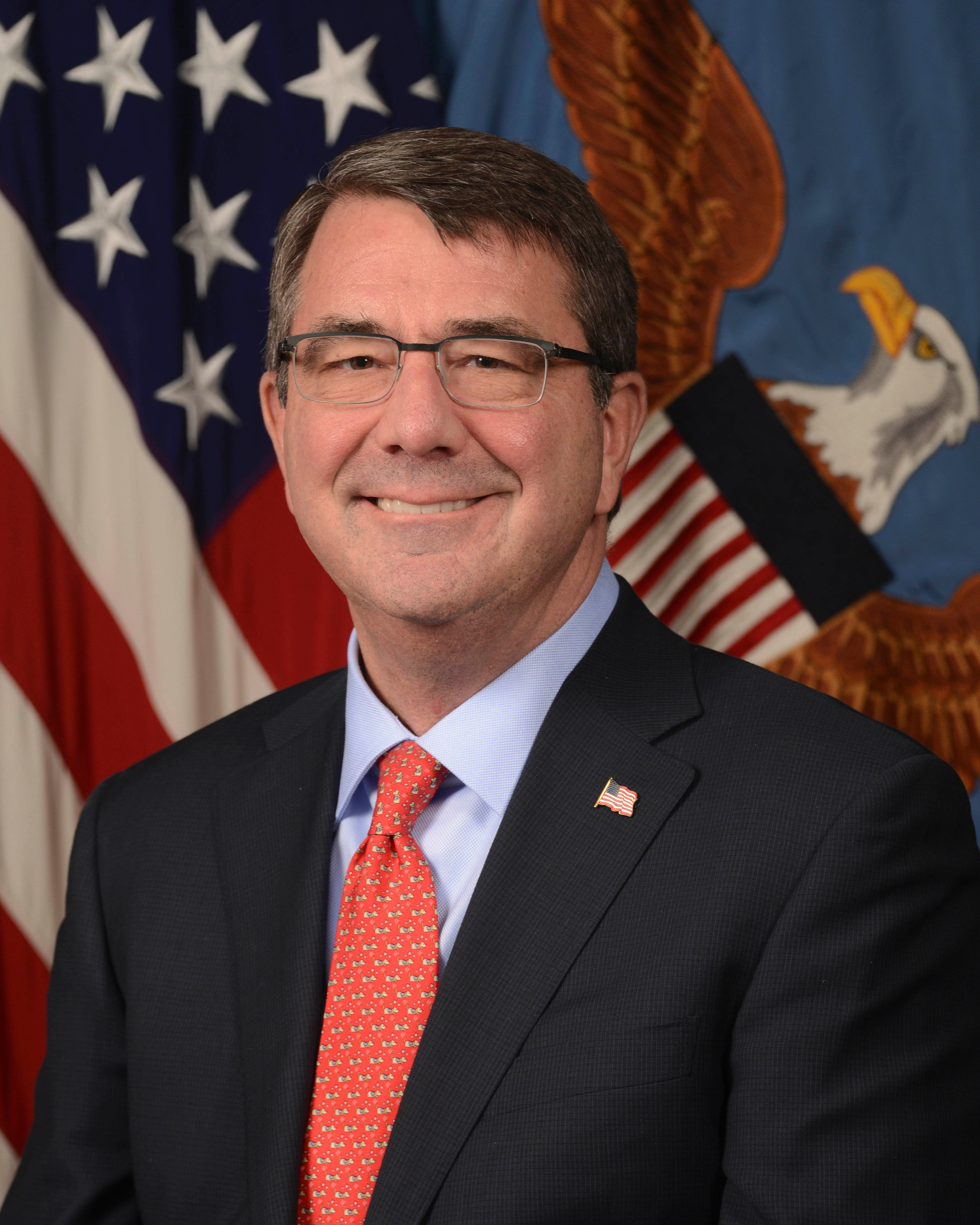
- Official portrait, 2015

25th United States Secretary of Defense
- In office February 17, 2015 – January 20, 2017
- President: Barack Obama
- Deputy: Robert O. Work
- Preceded by: Chuck Hagel
- Succeeded by: Jim Mattis

31st United States Deputy Secretary of Defense
- In office October 6, 2011 – December 4, 2013
- President: Barack Obama
- Secretary: Leon Panetta; Chuck Hagel
- Preceded by: William J. Lynn III
- Succeeded by: Christine Fox (acting)

Under Secretary of Defense for Acquisition, Technology and Logistics
- In office April 27, 2009 – October 5, 2011
- President: Barack Obama
- Preceded by: John J. Young Jr.
- Succeeded by: Frank Kendall III

Assistant Secretary of Defense for Global Strategic Affairs
- In office June 30, 1993 – September 14, 1996
- President: Bill Clinton
- Preceded by: Stephen Hadley
- Succeeded by: Jack Dyer Crouch II (2001)

Personal details
- Born: Ashton Baldwin Carter; September 24, 1954 Philadelphia, Pennsylvania, U.S.
- Died: October 24, 2022 (aged 68) Boston, Massachusetts, U.S.
- Party: Democratic
- Spouses: Clayton Spencer (divorced); Stephanie DeLeeuw
- Relations: Cynthia DeFelice (sister)
- Children: 2
- Education: Yale University (BA); St John's College, Oxford (DPhil)

Academic background
- Thesis: Hard processes in perturbative QCD (1979)
- Doctoral advisor: Christopher Llewellyn Smith
- Carter's voice Carter announces the opening of all military occupations and positions to women Recorded December 3, 2015

Ashton Baldwin Carter (September 24, 1954 – October 24, 2022) was an American government official and academic who served as the 25th United States secretary of defense from February 2015 to January 2017. He later served as director of the Belfer Center for Science & International Affairs at Harvard Kennedy School.

Carter began his career as a physicist. After a brief experience as an analyst for the Congressional Office of Technology Assessment, he switched careers to public policy. He joined the Kennedy School of Government at Harvard University in 1984 and became chair of the International & Global Affairs faculty. Carter served as Assistant Secretary of Defense for International Security Policy during President Clinton's first term, from 1993 to 1996, responsible for policy regarding the former Soviet states, strategic affairs, and nuclear weapons.

During President Obama's first term, Carter served first as Under Secretary of Defense for Acquisition, Technology and Logistics and then Deputy Secretary of Defense until December 2013. In February 2015, he replaced Chuck Hagel as Secretary of Defense and served in that capacity until the end of the Obama administration. During his tenure, he ended the ban on transgender officers in the military.

For his service to national security, Carter was awarded the DOD Distinguished Public Service Medal five times. He also received the CJCS Joint Distinguished Civilian Service Award and the Defense Intelligence Medal. He was posthumously awarded the Presidential Medal of Freedom in 2025 by President Joe Biden. Carter was author or co-author of eleven books and more than 100 articles on physics, technology, national security, and management.

== Early life ==
Ashton Baldwin Carter was born on September 24, 1954, in Philadelphia, Pennsylvania to William Stanley Carter Jr., a World War II veteran, United States Navy neurologist and psychiatrist, and longtime department chairman at Abington Memorial Hospital; and Anne Baldwin Carter, an English teacher. He had three siblings, including children's book author Cynthia DeFelice.

Carter was raised in Abington, Pennsylvania, on Wheatsheaf Lane. At age eleven, working at his first job at a Philadelphia car wash, he was fired for "wise-mouthing the owner."

=== Education ===
Carter was educated at Highland Elementary School (class of 1966) and at Abington Senior High School (class of 1972) in Abington. In high school, he was a wrestler, lacrosse player, cross-country runner, and president of the Honor Society. He was inducted into Abington Senior High School's Hall of Fame in 1989.

Carter attended the University of Edinburgh in Scotland in 1975. In 1976, Carter completed his Bachelor of Arts (BA) in his double-major of physics and medieval history at Yale College, summa cum laude, Phi Beta Kappa. His senior thesis, "Quarks, Charm and the Psi Particle", was published in the Yale Scientific Magazine in 1975. He was also an experimental research associate at Fermi National Accelerator Laboratory in 1975 (where he worked on quark research) and at Brookhaven National Laboratory in 1976.

Carter then became a Rhodes Scholar and studied at the University of Oxford. He received his Doctor of Philosophy (DPhil) in theoretical physics on Hard processes in perturbative QCD in 1979 and was supervised by Christopher Llewellyn Smith. He was a member of St John's College, Oxford.

Carter was subsequently a postdoctoral fellow research associate in theoretical physics at Rockefeller University from 1979 to 1980, studying time-reversal invariance and dynamical symmetry breaking. He coauthored two papers on CP violations in B meson decays with A. I. Sanda, which were used as one of theoretical basis to build B factories.

Carter was then a research fellow at the MIT Center for International Studies from 1982 to 1984, during which time he wrote a public report assessing that the Reagan-proposed "Star Wars" initiative could not protect the U.S. from a Soviet nuclear attack.

== Academic career ==
Carter taught at Harvard University, as an assistant professor from 1984 to 1986, associate professor from 1986 to 1988, professor and associate director of the Center for Science and International Affairs at Harvard University's John F. Kennedy School of Government from 1988 to 1990, and director of the center from 1990 to 1993. At the Kennedy School, he became chair of the International and Global Affairs faculty and Ford Foundation Professor of Science and International Affairs. He concurrently was co-director of the Preventive Defense Project of Harvard and Stanford Universities.

== Early Department of Defense career ==
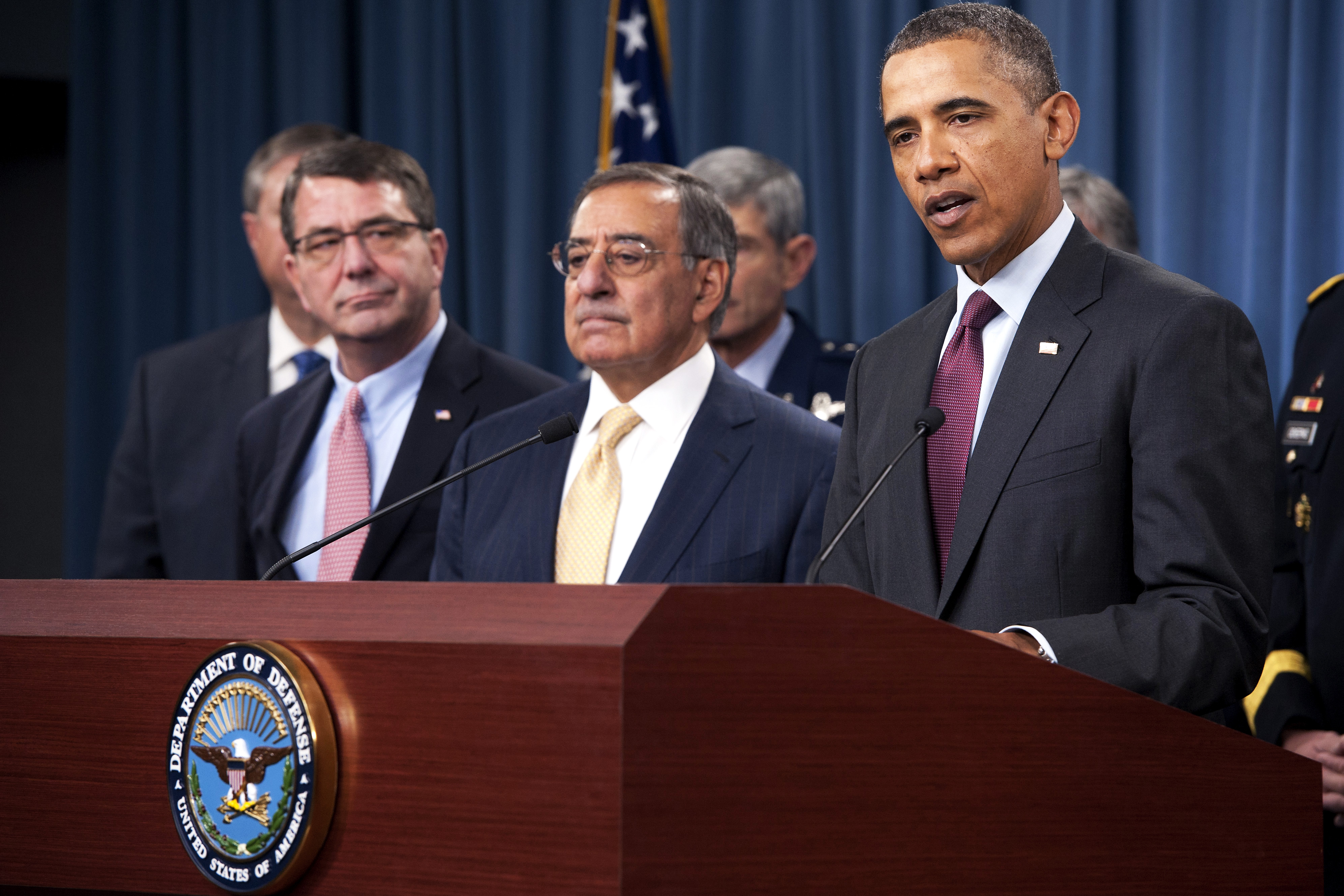
From left, Carter, Defense Secretary Leon Panetta, and President Barack Obama in 2012

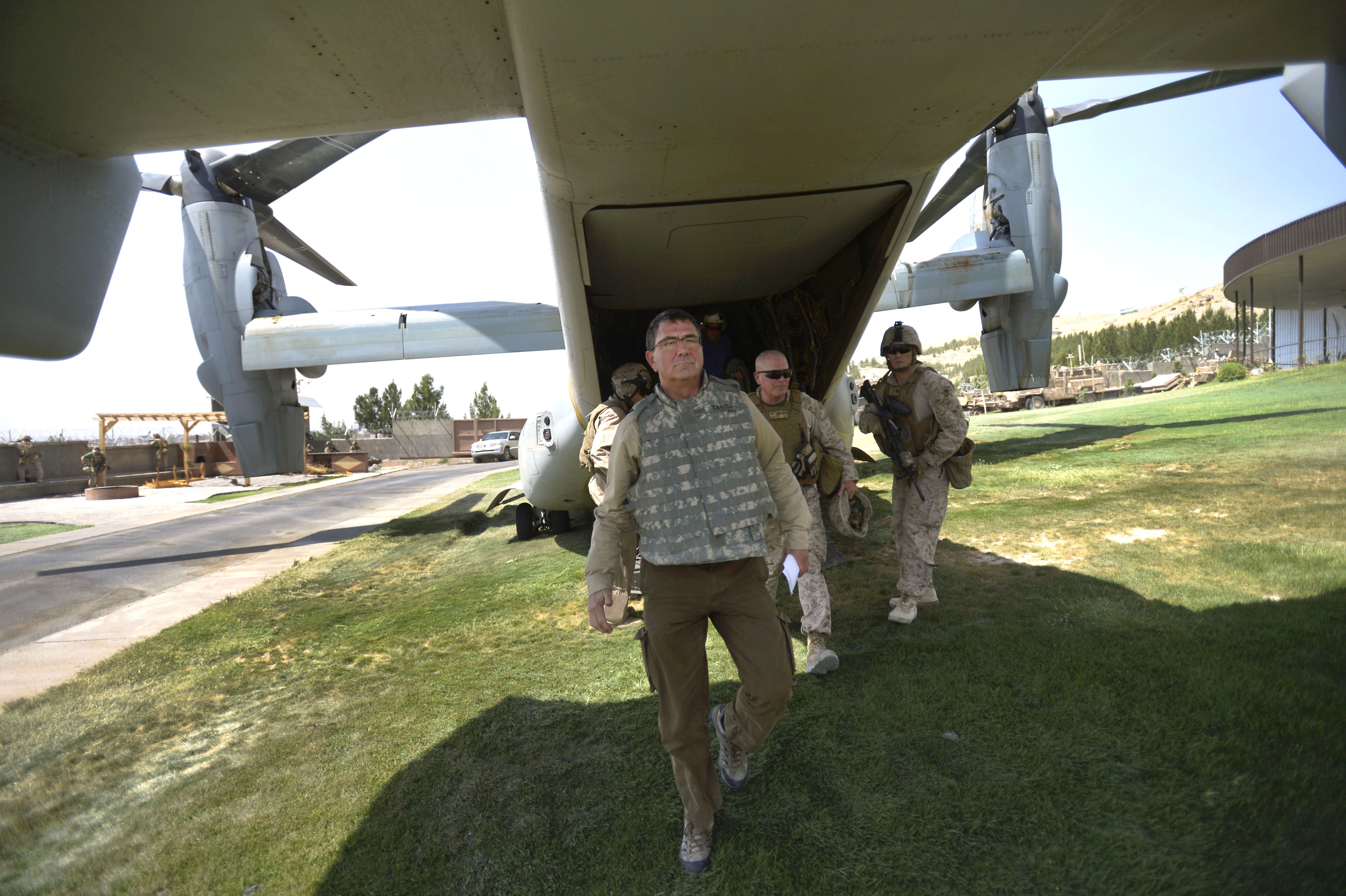
Carter arrives in Herat, Afghanistan, in 2013

From 1993 to 1996, Carter served as assistant secretary of defense for international security policy during President Bill Clinton's first term. He was responsible for strategic affairs, including dealing with the threat of weapons of mass destruction elsewhere in the world, nuclear weapons policy (including overseeing the U.S. nuclear arsenal and missile defenses), the 1994 Nuclear Posture Review, the Agreed Framework signed in 1994 which froze North Korea's plutonium-producing nuclear reactor program, the 1995 extension of the Nuclear Non-Proliferation Treaty, the negotiation of the 1996 Comprehensive Nuclear-Test-Ban Treaty, and the multibillion-dollar Nunn-Lugar Cooperative Threat Reduction program and Project Sapphire that removed all nuclear weapons from Ukraine, Kazakhstan, and Belarus. Carter directed military planning during the 1994 crisis over North Korea's nuclear weapons program. In addition, he was responsible for dealing with the establishment of defense and intelligence relationships with former Soviet countries in the wake of the collapse of the Soviet Union and its nuclear arsenal, and was chairman of NATO's High Level Group. He was also responsible for the Counter proliferation Initiative, control of sensitive U.S. exports, and negotiations that led to the deployment of Russian troops as part of the Bosnia Peace Plan Implementation Force.

From April 2009 to October 2011, Carter was Under Secretary of Defense for Acquisition, Technology, and Logistics, with responsibility for DOD's procurement reform and innovation agenda and completion of procurements such as the KC-46 tanker. He also led the development and production of thousands of mine-resistant ambush protected (MRAP) vehicles, and other acquisitions. He instituted "Better Buying Power", seeking smarter and leaner purchasing. From October 2011 to December 2013, Carter was Deputy Secretary of Defense, serving as the DOD's chief operating officer, overseeing the department's annual budget and its three million civilian and military personnel, steering strategy and budget through sequester, and directing the reform of DOD's national security export controls.

He was confirmed by Senate voice vote for both positions.[33]

In an April 4, 2013, speech, he affirmed that the 'Shift to Asia' initiative of President Obama was a priority that would not be affected by the budget sequestration in 2013. Carter noted that The Shift to Asia was principally an economic matter with new security implications. India, Australia, and New Zealand were mentioned as forthcoming security partners. His Pentagon arms-control responsibilities included matters involving the START II, ABM, CFE, and other arms-control treaties.

== Secretary of Defense (2015–2017) ==
=== Nomination and confirmation ===
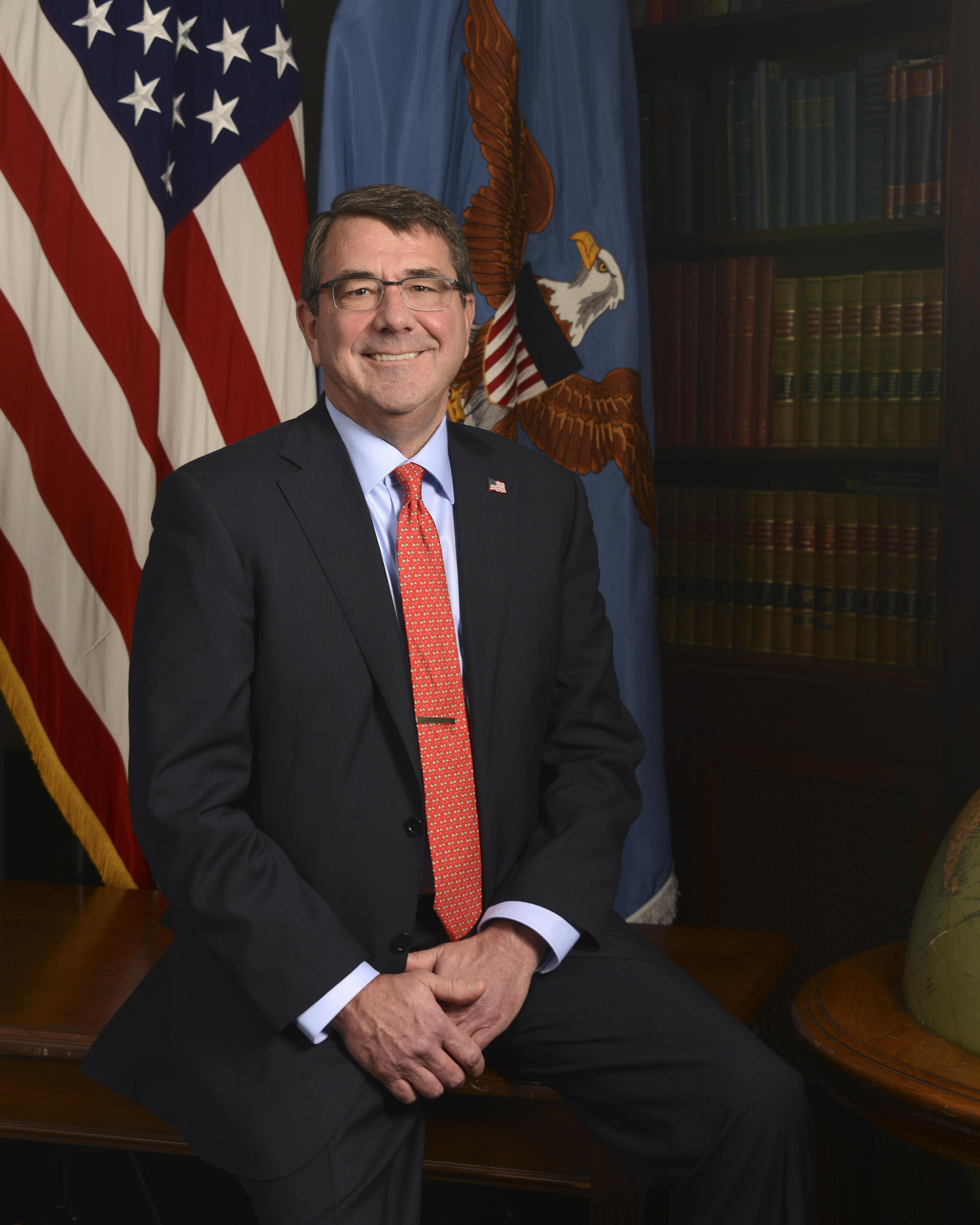
Carter's official portrait

Carter was nominated by President Barack Obama to be the 25th United States secretary of defense on December 5, 2014.

In his nomination hearing before the Senate Armed Services Committee, he said he was "very much inclined" to increase U.S. military aid to Ukraine. Speaking on the Middle East, he said the U.S. must militarily ensure a "lasting defeat" of Islamic State (ISIL) forces in Iraq and Syria. He also opined that the threats posed by Iran were as serious as those posed by the ISIL forces. He said he was not in favor of increasing the rate of prisoner releases from Guantanamo Bay.

Carter was approved unanimously on February 1, 2015, by the Senate Armed Services Committee. He was confirmed by the Senate on February 12 by a vote of 93–5 and sworn in by Vice President Joe Biden on February 17.

=== Tenure ===
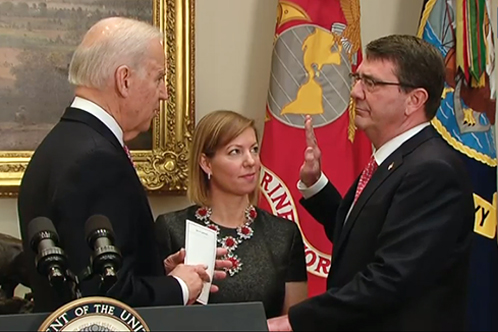
Vice President Joe Biden swears in Ash Carter as the 25th defense secretary as Carter's wife, Stephanie, looks on during a private ceremony at the White House.

In May 2015, Carter warned the People's Republic of China to halt its rapid island-building in the South China Sea.

In October 2015, Carter condemned Russian air strikes against ISIL and other rebel groups in Syria. On October 8, 2015, Carter, speaking at a meeting of NATO defense ministers in Brussels, said he believed Russia would soon start paying the price for its military intervention in Syria in the form of reprisal attacks and casualties.

A controversy arose in December 2015 when it was revealed that Carter had used a personal email account while conducting official business as Secretary of Defense.

In January 2016, at Carter's direction, the Department of Defense opened all military roles to women, overriding a request by the Marine Corps to continue to exempt women from certain positions. In June 2016, Carter announced that transgender individuals would be allowed to join and openly serve in the military.

== Other roles ==
From 1990 to 1993, Carter was chairman of the editorial board of International Security. Previously, he held positions at the Massachusetts Institute of Technology, the Congressional Office of Technology Assessment, and Rockefeller University.

In 1997, Carter and former CIA director John M. Deutch co-chaired the Catastrophic Terrorism Study Group which urged greater attention to terrorism. In 1998, Carter, Deutch, and Philip Zelikow (later executive director of the 9/11 Commission) published an article on "catastrophic terrorism" in Foreign Affairs. From 1998 to 2000, he was deputy to William J. Perry at the North Korea Policy Review and traveled with him to Pyongyang. In 2001–02, he served on the National Academy of Sciences Committee on Science and Technology for Countering Terrorism, and advised on the creation of the Department of Homeland Security. Carter was also co-director of the Preventive Defense Project, which designs and promotes security policies aimed at preventing the emergence of major new threats to the United States.

Carter had been a longtime member of the Defense Science Board and the Defense Policy Board, the principal advisory bodies to the Secretary of Defense. During the Bush administration, he was also a member of Secretary of State Condoleezza Rice's International Security Advisory Board; co-chair of the Senate Foreign Relations Committee's Policy Advisory Group; a consultant to the Defense Science Board; a member of the National Missile Defense White Team, and a member of the National Academy of Sciences Committee on International Security and Arms Control. He had testified frequently before the armed services, foreign relations, and homeland security committees of both houses of Congress.

In addition to his public service, Carter was a senior partner at Global Technology Partners, focused on advising investment firms in technology and defense. He was a consultant to Goldman Sachs and Mitretek Systems on international affairs and technology matters, and spoke frequently to business and policy audiences. Carter served as an independent director on the General Electric board of directors from 2020 until his death.

He was also a member of the boards of directors of the Mitre Corporation and Mitretek Systems and the advisory boards of MIT Lincoln Laboratory and Draper Laboratory. Carter was also a member of the Aspen Strategy Group, the Council on Foreign Relations, the American Physical Society, the International Institute for Strategic Studies, and the National Committee on U.S.-China Relations. Carter was elected a fellow of the American Academy of Arts and Sciences. He was named as a Fellow in the American Physical Society (Forum on Physics & Society) in 2015.

Carter served as an honorary director on the board of directors at the Atlantic Council. In April 2021, Carter joined Tanium Board of Directors. From 2021, he had been a member of the President's Council of Advisors on Science and Technology (PCAST). In 2021, Carter joined Shield Capital's board of Strategic Advisors.

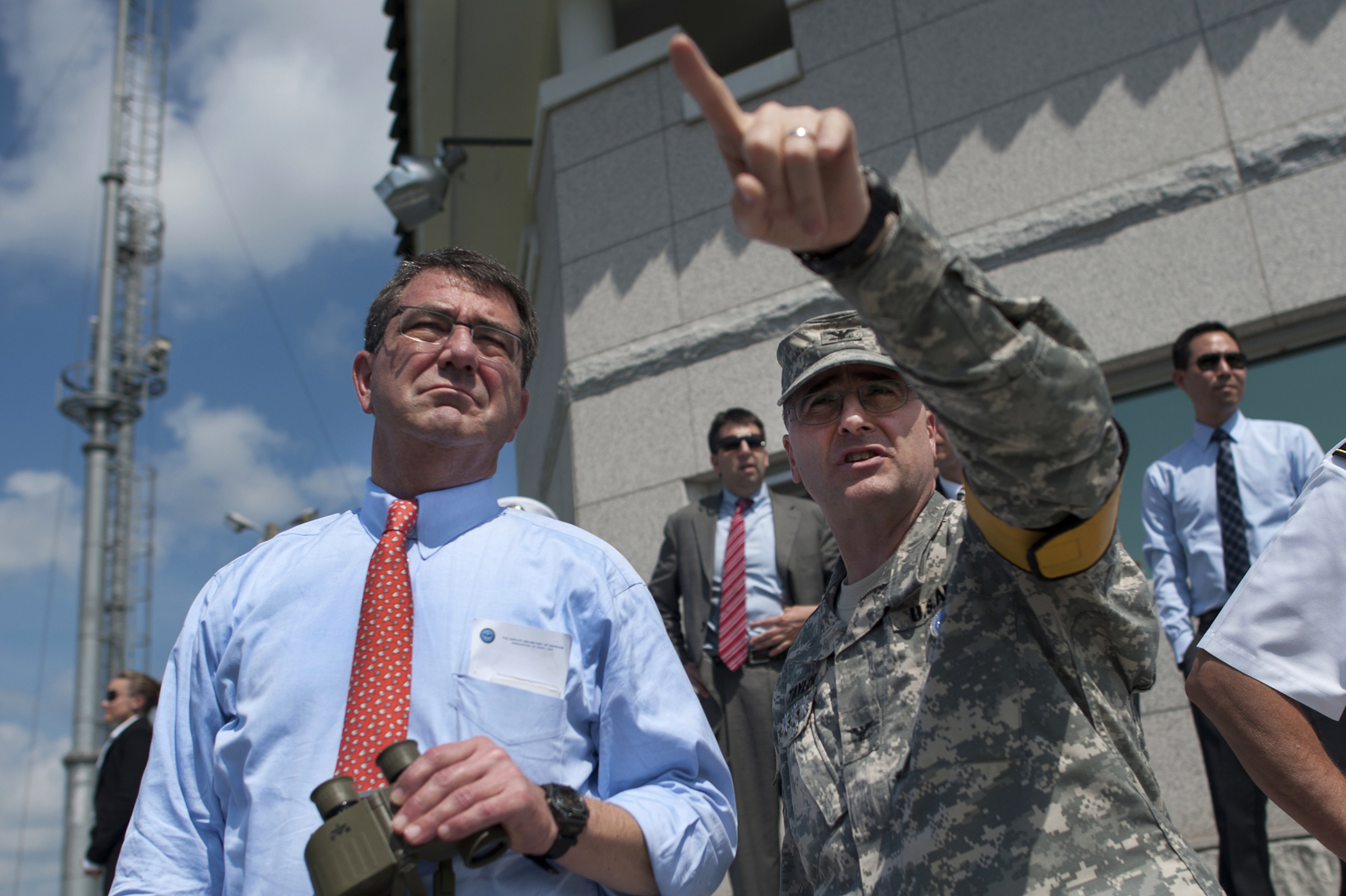
Carter at the demilitarized zone separating North and South Korea

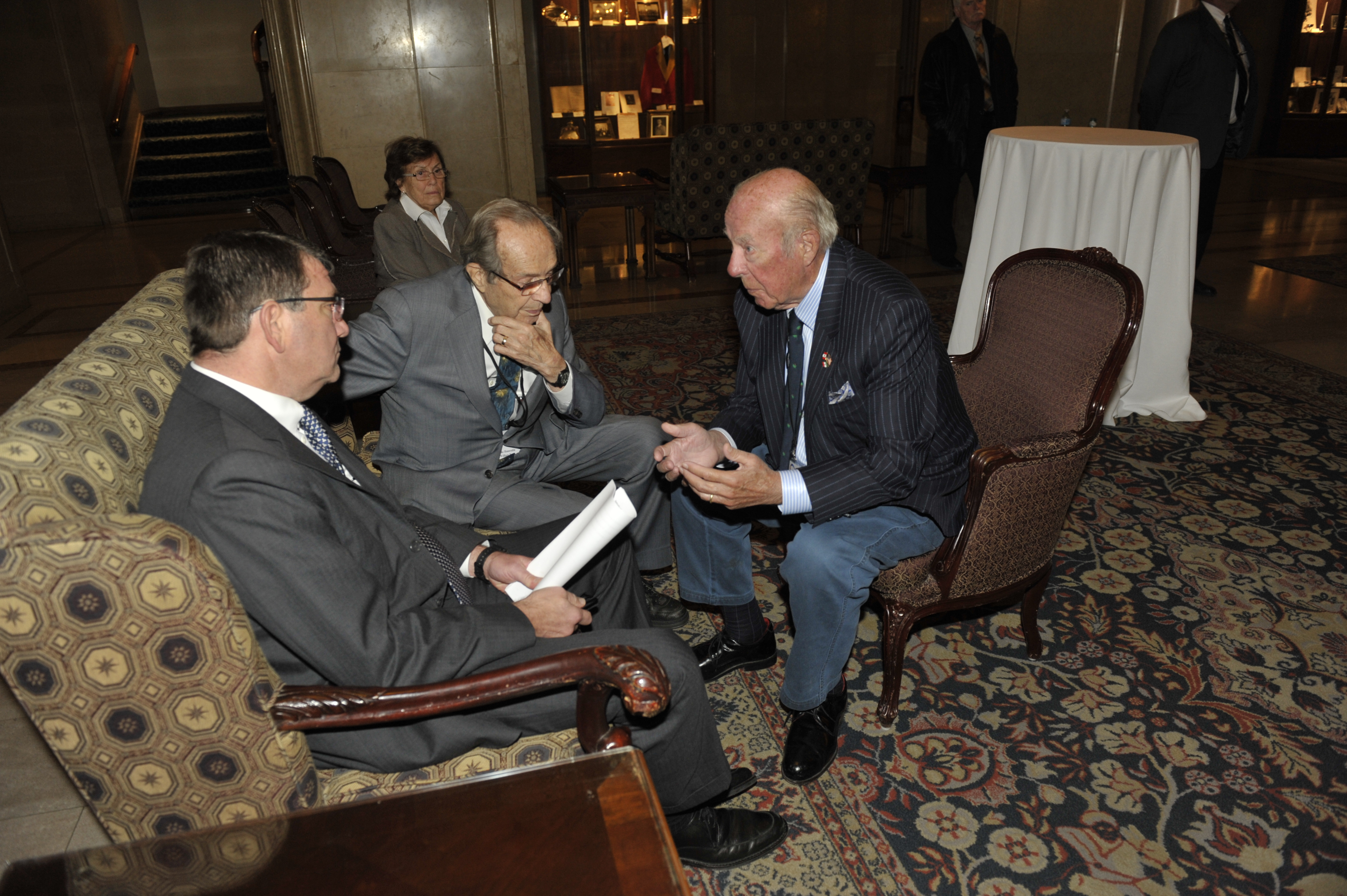
Carter, William Perry and former secretary of state George Shultz, October 12, 2012

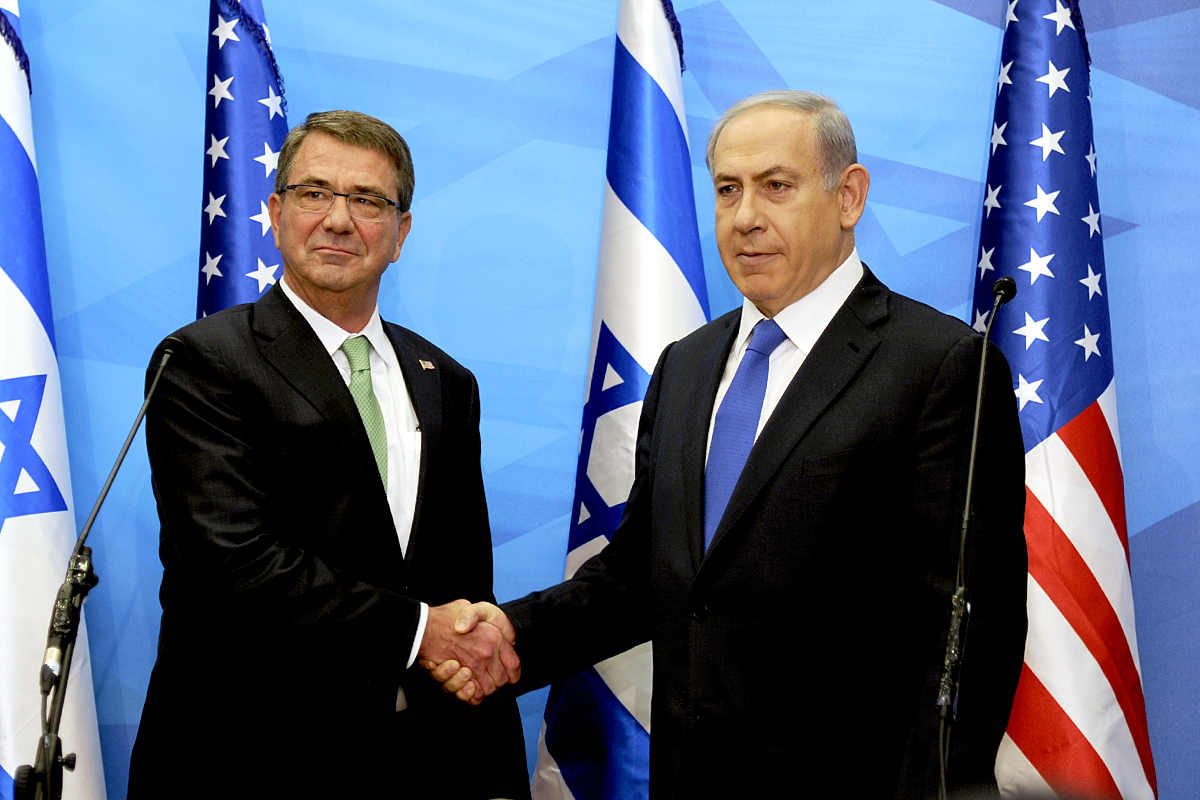
Carter meeting Israeli prime minister Benjamin Netanyahu in Israel, July 21, 2015

== Positions ==
=== Views on Iran ===
Carter's views on Iran had been perceived as hawkish. In 2006, he authored a report for the Carnegie Endowment for International Peace advocating use or threat of force to prevent Iran from obtaining nuclear weapons. Carter had supported diplomacy with Iran and written about methods of containing a nuclear-armed Tehran.

=== Support for military interventions ===
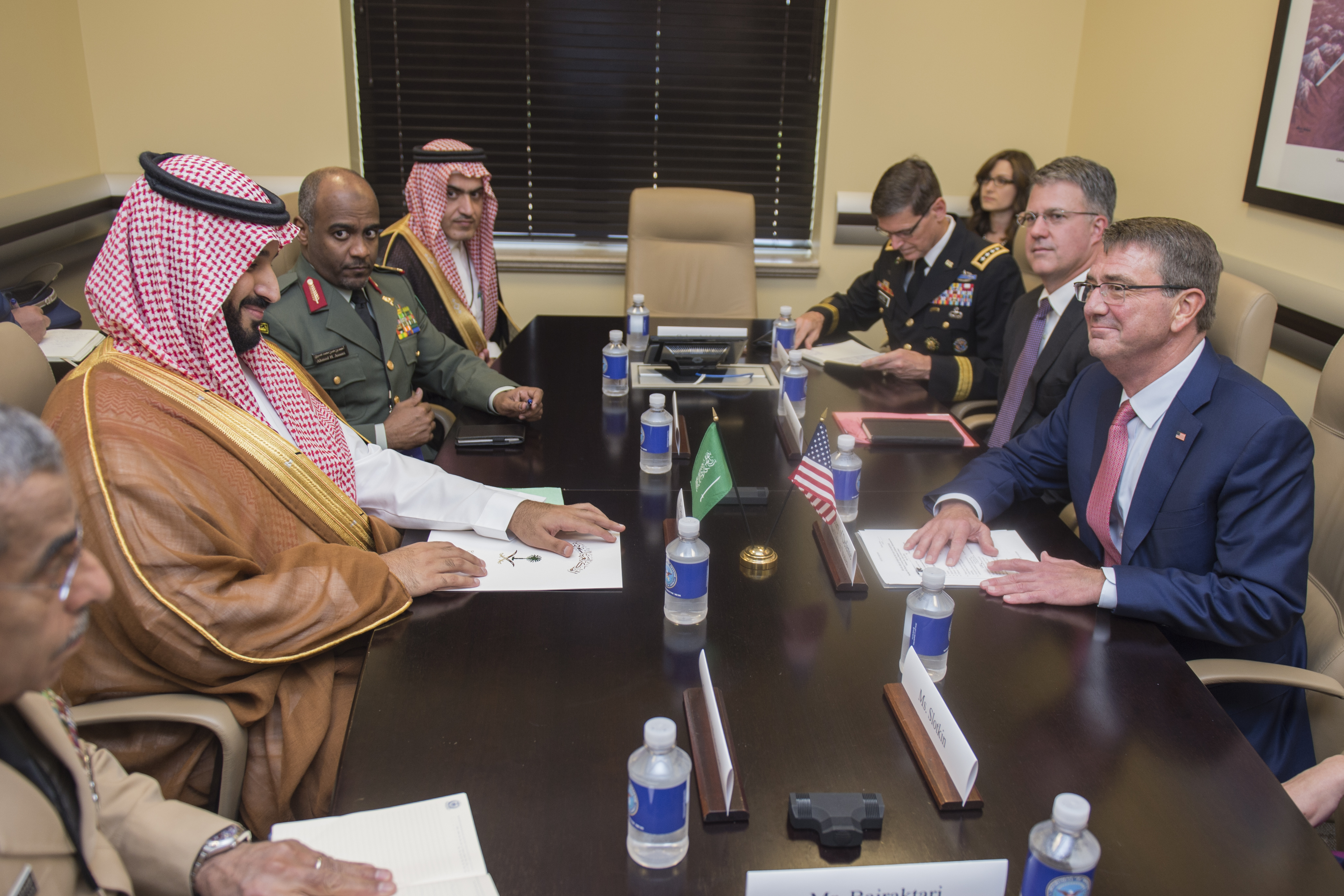
Carter meeting with Mohammed bin Salman and his advisor Ahmad Asiri in 2016

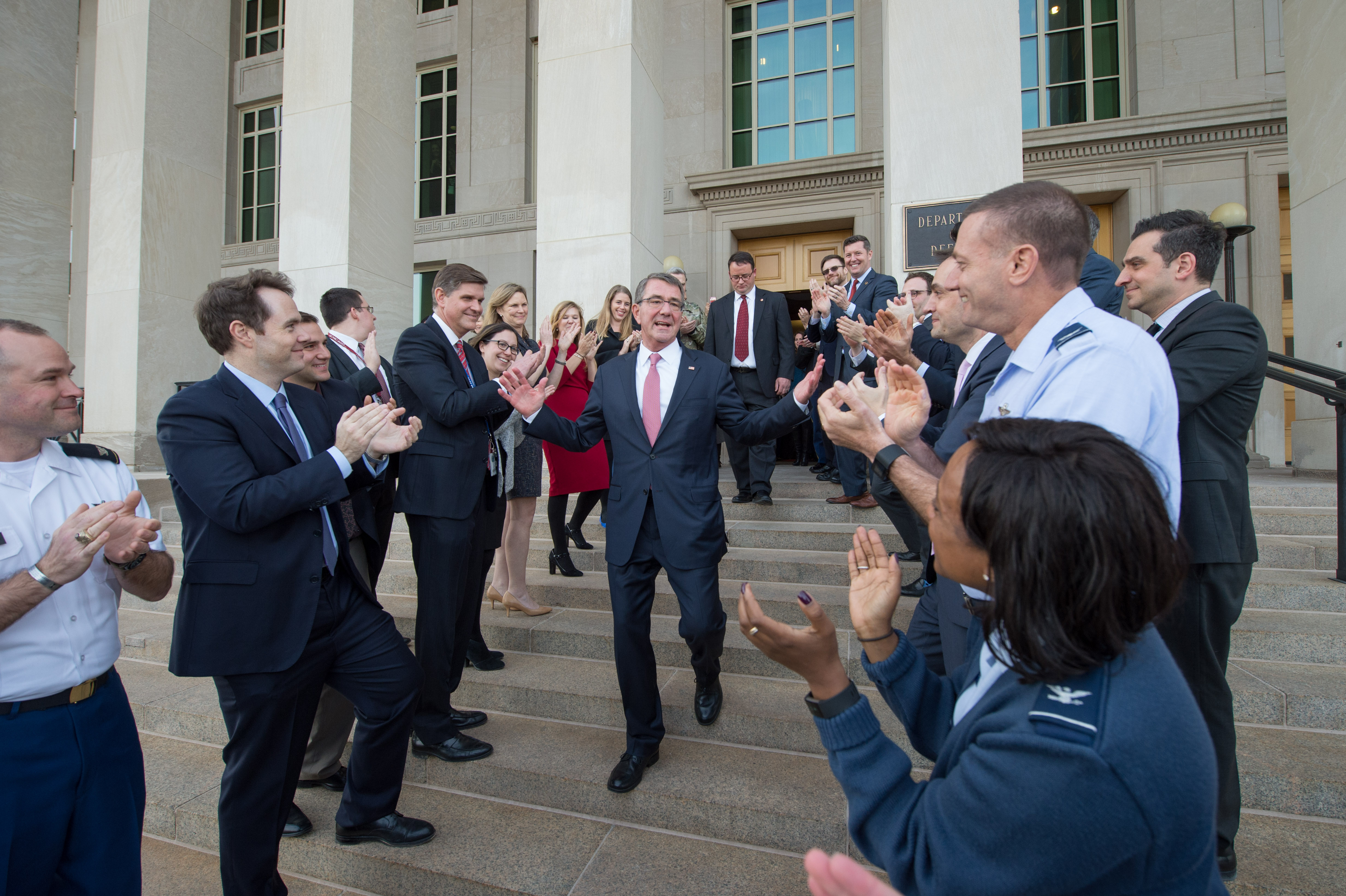
Carter departing from the Pentagon on his last day in office

Carter was a supporter of the 2003 invasion of Iraq, as well as an advocate of "preventative" invasions of North Korea and Iran. In response to increased tension in Ukraine, Carter considered deployment of ground-launched cruise missiles in Europe that could pre-emptively destroy Russian weapons.

=== Military involvement in presidential elections ===
In January 2021, Carter, alongside all of the other living former secretaries of defense, published a Washington Post op-ed piece opposing President Donald Trump's summons for military involvement in overturning the 2020 election results, and urging for a peaceful transition of power.

== Personal life and death ==
Carter was married to Stephanie DeLeeuw Carter. He had been previously married to Clayton Spencer, the eighth president of Bates College, with whom he had two children, Ava and William.

Carter died from a heart attack at his home in Boston on October 24, 2022, at age 68.

== Awards ==
Carter received the Ten Outstanding Young Americans award from the United States Junior Chamber in 1987. For his service to national security, Carter was awarded the DOD's highest civilian medal, the Department of Defense Medal for Distinguished Public Service, five times. For critical liaison efforts with the chairman of the Joint Chiefs of Staff and the geographic combatant commanders, he was awarded the Chairman of the Joint Chiefs of Staff Joint Distinguished Civilian Service Award in 2013 and the Defense Intelligence Medal for his contributions to intelligence. On January 4, 2025, Carter was posthumously awarded the Presidential Medal of Freedom by President Joe Biden.

== Works ==
In addition to authoring numerous articles, scientific publications, government studies, and Congressional testimonies, Carter co-edited and co-authored 11 books:

- MX Missile Basing (1981)
- Ballistic Missile Defense (1984)
- Directed Energy Missile Defense in Space (1984)
- Managing Nuclear Operations (1987)
- Soviet Nuclear Fission: Control of the Nuclear Arsenal in a Disintegrating Soviet Union (1991)
- Beyond Spinoff: Military and Commercial Technologies in a Changing World. Harvard Business Review Press. 1992. ISBN 978-0875843186.
- A New Concept of Cooperative Security. Brookings Institution Press. 1992. ISBN 978-0815781455.
- Cooperative Denuclearization: From Pledges to Deeds. Harvard University Press. 1993.
- Preventive Defense: A New Security Strategy for America. Brookings Institution Press. 1997. ISBN 978-0815713081.
- Keeping the Edge: Managing Defense for the Future. MIT Press. 2001. ISBN 978-0262032902.
- Inside the Five-Sided Box: Lessons from a Lifetime of Leadership in the Pentagon. E. P. Dutton. 2019. ISBN 978-1524743918.

Political offices
Preceded by Stephen Hadley	Assistant Secretary of Defense for Global Strategic Affairs; 1993–1996	Vacant Title next held by Jack Dyer Crouch II
Preceded by John Young	Under Secretary of Defense for Acquisition, Technology and Logistics; 2009–2011	Succeeded by Frank Kendall
Preceded by William J. Lynn III	United States Deputy Secretary of Defense; 2011–2013	Succeeded by Robert O. Work
Preceded by Chuck Hagel	United States Secretary of Defense; 2015–2017	Succeeded by Jim Mattis
