= Peter C. W. Flory =

American attorney and Defense official

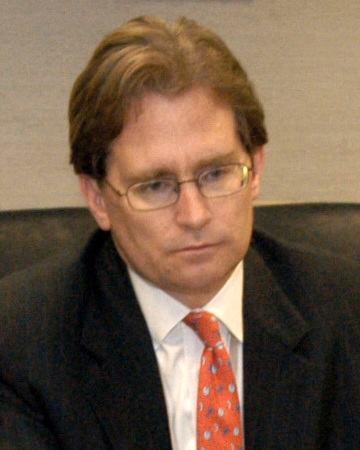
- Peter Flory in 2005

NATO Assistant Secretary General for Defence Investment
- In office January 2007 – August 2010
- Preceded by: Marshall Billingslea
- Succeeded by: Patrick Auroy

Assistant Secretary of Defense for International Security Policy
- In office 2 August 2005 – 1 December 2006
- Preceded by: J.D. Crouch II
- Succeeded by: Joseph Benkert

Principal Deputy Assistant Secretary of Defense for International Security Affairs
- In office July 2001 – 1 August 2005

Personal details
- Born: 16 October 1955 (age 70) Pinehurst, North Carolina
- Education: McGill University (BA); Georgetown University (JD)

Peter Cyril Wyche Flory (born 16 October 1955) is an American attorney who served as the NATO Assistant Secretary General for Defence Investment from January 2007 to August 2010. He previously served in the George W. Bush Administration as the Assistant Secretary of Defense for International Security Policy from August 2005 to December 2006.

== Early life and education ==
Born in Pinehurst, North Carolina, Flory is a 1973 graduate of St. Mark's School in Southborough, Massachusetts. He attended McGill University in Montreal, graduating with a B.A. degree in 1979. Flory continued his education by taking courses at the Columbia University Graduate School of Journalism until 1980. He later earned his J.D. degree from the Georgetown University Law Center in 1993.

== Career ==
In February 1993, Flory joined the law firm of Hughes Hubbard & Reed in Washington, D.C. and worked as an attorney there until April 1997, when he became a counsel for the United States Senate Select Committee on Intelligence. After the election of President George W. Bush, he became the Principal Deputy Assistant Secretary of Defense for International Security Affairs in July 2001.

President Bush nominated him to be the Assistant Secretary of Defense for International Security Policy on 1 June 2004. Flory appeared before the Senate Committee on Armed Services on 21 July 2004 and the nomination was reported favorably to the full Senate on 30 September 2004. Receiving no further consideration during the 108th Congress, it was returned to the President on 8 December 2004. His nomination was resubmitted to the Senate on 24 January 2005, but it was not reported back to the full Senate by the Committee on Armed Services until 28 July 2005. President Bush used his recess appointment power to grant Flory the position on 2 August 2005. The Senate never officially confirmed his appointment and the position of Assistant Secretary for International Security Policy was discontinued on 1 December 2006, with its responsibilities being transferred to other Assistant Secretaries of Defense.

In January 2007, Flory replaced Marshall Billingslea as NATO Assistant Secretary General for Defence Investment in Brussels. He was succeeded by Patrick Auroy in October 2010.

== Personal ==
Flory is the son of Henry Cyril Flory (28 August 1910 – 5 September 2001) and Elizabeth "Betsy" Wyche (15 November 1919 – 19 November 2007), who were married on 13 February 1954. His father was an immigrant to the United States who had been born in Wales and had served as a captain in the R.A.F. during World War II. His mother was the daughter of Army Major General Ira T. Wyche. Flory has three sisters and two nieces.

Flory married Kathleen Marie McGovern on 26 November 1983 in Moore County, North Carolina. They have three sons and three daughters - Henry, Seamus, Fiona, Xavier, Isabelle, and Mairead. .
