= Executive Order 13128 =

1999 United States executive order

Executive Order 13128 is a United States executive order (EO) issued by Bill Clinton in 1999. It authorized the Departments of State and Commerce to create regulations regarding the implementation of the Chemical Weapons Convention.

== Background ==
The United States Senate ratified U.S. participation in the Chemical Weapons Convention (CWC) on April 25, 1997. On October 25, 1998 the U.S. Congress passed the Chemical Weapons Implementation Act of 1998, legislation which formally implemented the treaty's many provisions. Among those provisions were requirements for signatories to develop new regulations to deal with the transfer of chemicals and technologies that can be used for chemical warfare purposes.

== Order ==
Executive Order 13128 was signed by then-U.S. President Bill Clinton on June 25, 1999. EO 13128 partially implemented the CWC, a treaty; treaties can be and are sometimes partially implemented by executive order. In addition, with its signing the order established the U.S. Department of State as the lead national agency for coordinating the implementation of and the provisions of both the CWC and the 1998 law with the various branches and agencies of the federal government. The executive order also authorized the U.S. Department of Commerce to establish regulations, obtain and execute warrants, provide assistance to certain facilities, and carry out other functions consistent with the CWC and the 1998 act.

== Results ==
The Department of Commerce published an interim rule on December 30, 1999, through the Bureau of Industry and Security (BIS), which established the Chemical Weapons Convention Regulations (CWCR). The CWCR implemented all provisions of the CWC which affected U.S. persons and industry. The BIS rule was published after extensive comments from the U.S. Chemical Manufacturers Association and others. The U.S Department of State issued its own regulations which dealt with taking samples at chemical weapons sites as well as criminal and civil punishments for violation of the provisions of the CWC.

== See also ==
- Executive Order 11850
- Geneva Protocol
- Statement on Chemical and Biological Defense Policies and Programs
