= Statement on Chemical and Biological Defense Policies and Programs =

1969 speech by U.S. President Richard Nixon

- Date: November 25, 1969
- Location: White House, Washington, D.C., U.S.
- Outcome: Unilateral termination of the U.S. offensive biological weapons program; U.S. ratification of the Geneva Protocol (1975); U.S. signing and ratification of the Biological Weapons Convention

The "Statement on Chemical and Biological Defense Policies and Programs" was a speech delivered on November 25, 1969, by U.S. President Richard Nixon. In the speech, Nixon announced the end of the U.S. offensive biological weapons program and reaffirmed a no-first-use policy for chemical weapons. The statement excluded toxins, herbicides and riot-control agents as they were not chemical and biological weapons, though herbicides and riot-control agents were both later restricted. The decision to ban biological weapons was influenced by a number of domestic and international issues, including pressure from opposition to United States involvement in the Vietnam War, increased scrutiny of the programs' budgets, and a consensus that biological weapons were not effective or necessary, and had little strategic value compared to the vast US nuclear arsenal.

The statement precipitated the 1975 US ratification of the Geneva Protocol and the Biological Weapons Convention. The Soviet biological weapons program continued for the remainder of the Cold War. The US chemical weapons arsenal was maintained as a deterrent to Soviet chemical use, especially in a hypothetical European conflict with NATO.

== Push for a U.S. ban ==
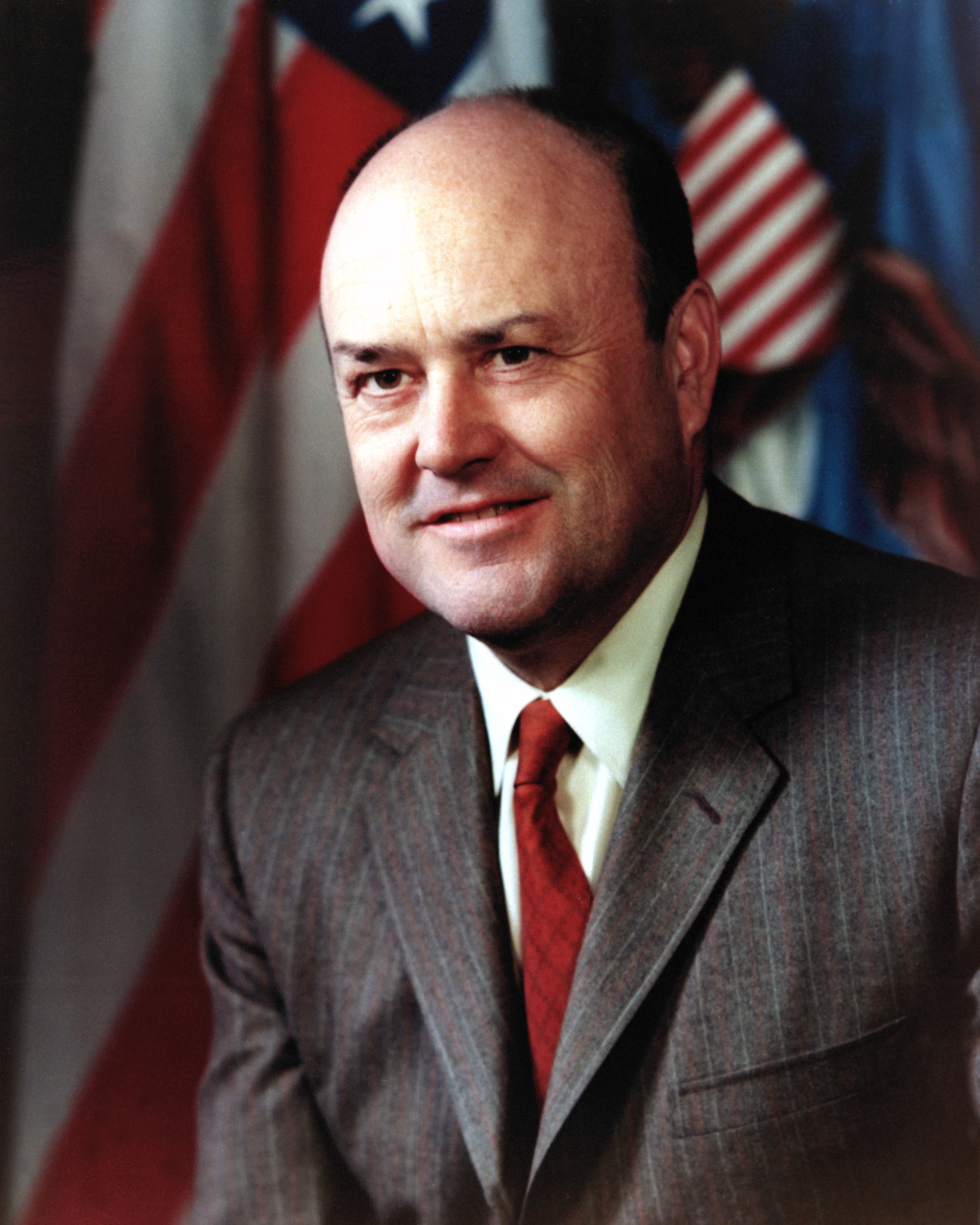
Melvin Laird played a key role in the build-up to a U.S. ban on biological weapons.

When Richard Nixon selected Melvin Laird as his Secretary of Defense in early 1969, Laird directed the Department of Defense to undertake a comprehensive review of U.S. biological warfare (BW) programs. Laird's push for a review of both the chemical and biological programs arose when Congress attempted to push the Pentagon for open, joint Congressional hearings on chemical-biological warfare (CBW). The Pentagon balked and the result was Laird's memorandum to National Security Advisor Henry Kissinger urging a review of those weapons programs. Laird's memorandum to Kissinger expresses fear that the United States will be under "increasing fire" for the program and calls for the National Security Council to initiate a study.

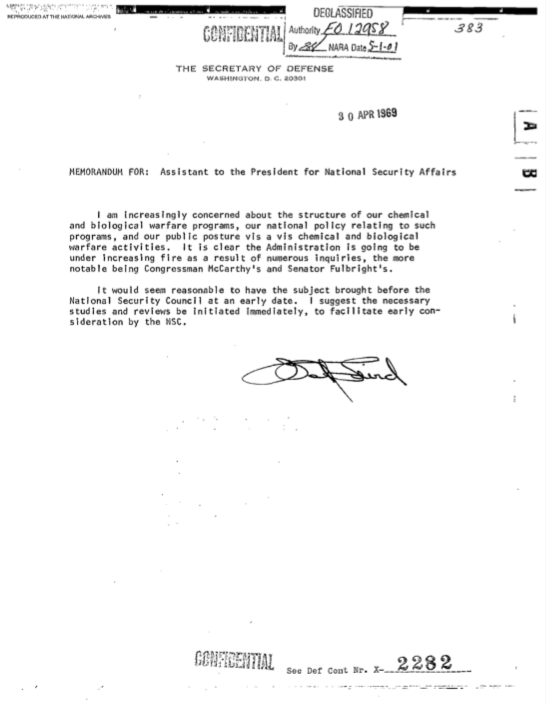
Memorandum sent from Laird to Kissinger

Laird hoped to eliminate the U.S. BW program. He saw two reasons to kill the BW program. The first was political—eliminating the program could deflect growing protests over Vietnam. The second was budgetary: As a U.S. Representative, Laird had watched Pentagon BW budgets balloon during the Kennedy and Johnson years. With Laird's impetus, and the concurrence of the National Security Council staff, in late May 1969 Kissinger directed key administration officials to begin a review of CBW "policies, programs and operational concepts" with a report to be issued no later than September.

Surprisingly, Laird found the Joint Chiefs of Staff receptive to BW elimination as well. In twice weekly meetings with the Joint Chiefs during 1969 Laird found none of the officers opposed to ending the U.S. BW program. They found the weapons ineffective and militarily useless, especially when compared to the U.S. nuclear arsenal. The Joint Chiefs made two demands, one was to continue defensive germ warfare research and the other was that they be allowed to maintain the U.S. chemical arsenal as a deterrent to the Soviet Union, especially in the event of a European conflict with NATO.

In June 1969 Kissinger asked a former Harvard colleague, Matthew Meselson to prepare a position paper on U.S. chemical and biological weapons programs. Meselson and Paul Doty then organized a private conference to discuss policy issues. The result was a September 1969 paper that not only urged U.S. ratification of the Geneva Protocol but an end to U.S. BW programs. Meselson and his colleagues argued that a biological attack would likely inflict a great toll on civilian populations while remaining largely militarily ineffective.

Executive action on BW was followed by congressional action on chemical warfare (CW). In August 1969 the Senate passed an amendment to the Military Procurement Bill which unilaterally renounced first-use of chemical weapons. The Senate action also issued a moratorium on the acquisition of new chemical weapons as well as de-emphasizing the need for CW readiness. The bill passed 91–0, although some senators expressed reservations about the CW provisions.

In 1969, the US also ceased its use of herbicides and riot-control agents in Indochina as part of the Vietnam War. These would later be restricted to an individual use approval basis in a 1975 executive order signed by president Gerald Ford.

== Statement ==
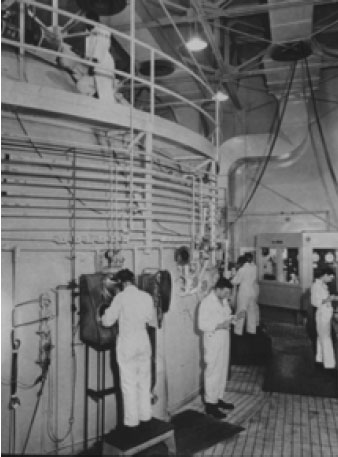
Nixon delivered his statement from Fort Detrick, home of the One-Million-Liter Test Sphere, used for testing static aerosols of biological agent, pictured here in 1968.

Nixon issued his "Statement on Chemical and Biological Defense Policies and Programs" on November 25, 1969, in a speech from Fort Detrick. The same day he gave a speech from the Roosevelt Room at the White House further outlining his earlier statement. The statement ended, unconditionally, all U.S. offensive biological weapons programs. Nixon noted that biological weapons were unreliable and stated:

The United States shall renounce the use of lethal biological agents and weapons, and all other methods of biological warfare. The United States will confine its biological research to defensive measures such as immunization and safety measures.

In his speech Nixon called his move "unprecedented"; and it was in fact the first review of the U.S. BW program since 1954. Despite the lack of review, the BW program had increased in cost and size since 1961; when Nixon ended the program the budget was $300 million annually. Nixon's statement confined all biological weapons research to defensive-only and ordered the destruction of the existing U.S. biological arsenal.

The Nixon statement also addressed the topics of chemical warfare and U.S. ratification of the Geneva Protocol, which, at the time, the nation had yet to ratify. On chemical warfare Nixon reaffirmed no-first-use of chemical weapons by the United States. He also announced that the United States would reconsider ratification of the Geneva Protocol, which Nixon recommended to the Senate that year.

== Omissions ==
The presidential statement purposely omitted certain agents, while others were simply overlooked. In an exception to the no-first-use policy, which his statement reaffirmed, Nixon made a deference for riot-control agents and herbicides. Both were in use in Vietnam and both had been lightning rods for criticism. Nixon promised later memorandums concerning abolition of both types of agents; herbicide use in Vietnam was discontinued in 1970 but riot-control agent use continued.

The other major omission from Nixon's statement were toxins. His statement did not specifically address toxins, such as ricin, which tend to blur the line between chemical and biological weapons. As debate within the Army raged over whether toxins were considered chemical or biological weapons concerning the president's order, work on them continued at Fort Detrick, the "hub" of U.S. biological weapons programs. For several months following the November order, the Army continued working on staphylococcus enterotoxin type B (SEB). On February 20, 1970, Nixon added toxins, regardless of their means of production—be it chemical or biological, to the U.S. ban on biological weapons.

== Results and legacy ==
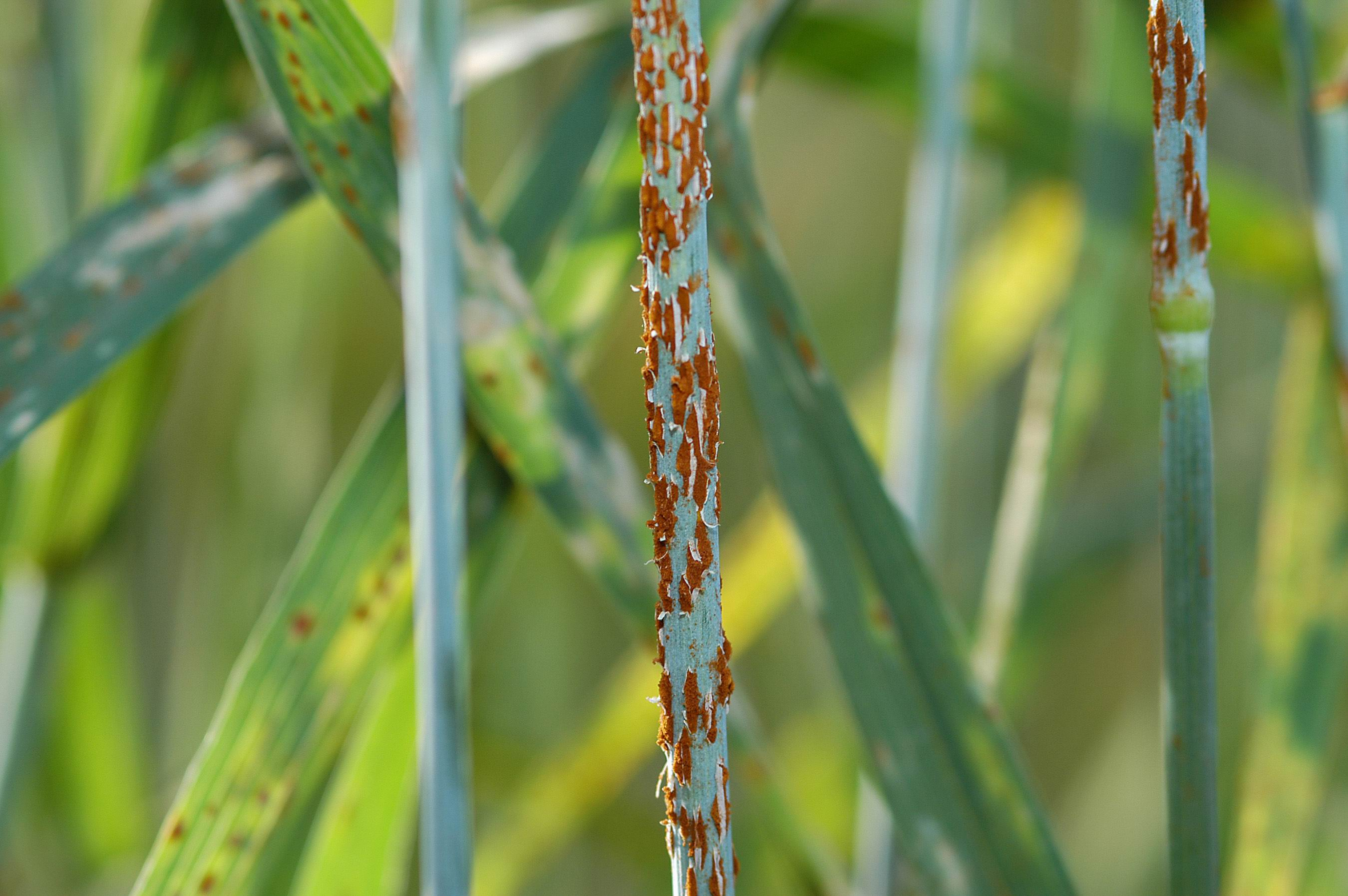
Stockpiled wheat stem rust (pictured) and other anti-crop agents were destroyed in 1973 as a result of Nixon's statement.

The statement immediately led to National Security Decision Memorandum 35 from Nixon, which was also dated November 25, 1969. The memorandum also stated that the U.S. government renounced all "lethal methods" and "all other methods" of biological warfare, it also stated that the U.S. would only conduct BW research and development for defensive purposes.

U.S. biological weapons stocks were destroyed over the next few years. A $12 million disposal plan was undertaken at Pine Bluff Arsenal, where all U.S. anti-personnel biological agents were stored. That plan was completed in May 1972 and included decontamination of facilities at Pine Bluff. Other agents, including anti-crop agents such as wheat stem rust, were stored at Beale Air Force Base and Rocky Mountain Arsenal. These anti-crop agents, along with agents at Fort Detrick used for research purposes were destroyed in March 1973.

Nixon closed his statement, "Mankind already carries in its own hands too many of the seeds of its own destruction. By the examples we set today, we hope to contribute to an atmosphere of peace and understanding between nations and among men." Shortly after Nixon's statement the United States and the Soviet Union began the SALT arms control talks, which eventually resulted in nuclear arms controls as well as the 1972 Antiballistic Missile Treaty. The U.S. commitment to end BW programs helped provide the lead for ongoing talks led by the United Kingdom in Geneva. The Eighteen Nation Disarmament Committee was discussing a British draft of a biological weapons treaty which the United Nations General Assembly approved in 1968 and that NATO supported. These arms control talks would eventually lead to the Biological Weapons Convention, an international treaty outlawing biological warfare.

Nixon's renunciation is often overlooked in discussions about his presidency and his presidential legacy. Books about Nixon devote little space to the act and those centered on the topic of arms-control, even less. The abandonment of an entire class of weapons remains unrepeated in U.S. history. In addition, Melvin Laird's role in the elimination of offensive U.S. biological capabilities has been largely overlooked. The official U.S. Army history of the U.S. biological warfare program, which spans from the early Cold War to 1969 and includes an overview of biowarfare research, Fort Derick contracts between U.S. universities and the private industry, as well as testing on human volunteers, was published online by the National Security Archives.

== Nixon's motivation ==
Scholars and critics have argued that Nixon's decision to ban biological weapons was purely politically motivated. This move was seen as a way to placate national, Congressional, and international concerns. It was also seen as a way to progress arms-control talks, additionally it could have stymied the outcry over the use of non-lethal chemical agents in Vietnam. In reality, the issue was much more complex than even those reasons suggest.

Meselson and others had argued that biological weapons amounted to little more than a cheap version of a nuclear weapon, and were easily attainable. Biological weapons represented a significant threat in the hands of less-well-armed, poorer nations, and Nixon surely recognized this "asymmetrical" threat. The administration eventually came to the conclusion that any biological threat could be easily countered with the U.S. nuclear arsenal.

Dead sheep resulting from the Skull Valley sheep kill

Nixon recognized that the BW program was unpopular and decided that there was no real reason to continue these programs. While there were some political considerations involved in Nixon's decision, the result brought the topic into international forums for years following his declaration. The media characterized Nixon's decision as a sudden awareness of the horrific nature of chemical-biological warfare.

Nixon hoped that the move would bolster both the image of his administration and the United States as a whole. He also wanted to score points with the Democratic majority in Congress and he had chosen to do this through various arms control measures. Nixon knew Democrats could not afford to oppose his renunciation of BW programs in light of rising opposition to the use of non-lethal chemicals in Vietnam and other events such as the Skull Valley sheep kill in Utah. Thus, the idealistic language Nixon used in his November statement was only part of the story. Besides the issue of proliferation raised by Meselson, the specter of growing dissent over Vietnam loomed large, as did the fact that the U.S. had never ratified the Geneva Protocol. In the end, Nixon was motivated to ban biological weapons in the United States by a host of issues.

== See also ==
- Biological Weapons Convention
- Executive Order 11850
- Executive Order 13128
- Operation Ranch Hand
