= Cynthia DeFelice =

American novelist (1951–2024)

- Born: December 8, 1951 Philadelphia, Pennsylvania, U.S.
- Died: May 24, 2024 (aged 72)
- Occupation: Writer
- Genre: Children's literature

Cynthia Carter DeFelice (December 8, 1951 – May 24, 2024) was an American children's writer. She wrote 16 novels and 12 picture books for young readers. The intended audience for her novels is children of reading ages nine to twelve.

== Life and career ==
Carter was born in 1951 in Philadelphia, Pennsylvania. Her father was a psychiatrist, and her mother was an English teacher, who stopped working to raise Cynthia and her siblings. DeFelice credited her mother for sparking her interest in books. She graduated from William Smith College in 1973. Among her three siblings was former US Secretary of Defense Ashton Carter. She began writing children's books in 1987. She lived in Geneva, New York. DeFelice died on May 24, 2024, aged 72.

== Bibliography ==
=== Children's novels ===
- The Strange Night Writing of Jessamine Colter, Atheneum (1988), ISBN 0-02-726451-3
- Weasel, Atheneum (1990), ISBN 0-02-726457-2 (1993 Sequoyah Book Award winner)
- Devil’s Bridge, Gale Group (1992), ISBN 0-02-726465-3
- The Light on Hogback Hill Atheneum (1993), ISBN 0-02-726453-X
- Lostman’s River, Atheneum (1994), ISBN 0-02-726466-1
- The Ghost of Fossil Glen, Farrar Straus (1998), ISBN 0-374-31787-9
- Nowhere to Call Home Farrar Straus (1999), ISBN 0-374-35552-5
- Death at Devil’s Bridge Farrar Straus (2000), ISBN 0-374-31723-2
- The Ghost and Mrs. Hobbs, Farrar Straus (2001)
- The Ghost of Cutler Creek, Farrar Straus (2004), ISBN 0-374-38058-9
- Under the Same Sky, Farrar Straus (2005), ISBN 978-0-374-48065-3
- Missing Manatee, Farrar Straus (2005), ISBN 0-374-31257-5 (nominated for a 2006 Edgar Award by the Mystery Writers of America)
- Bringing Ezra Back, Farrar Straus (2006) (sequel to Weasel)
- The Ghost of Poplar Point, Farrar Straus (2007), ISBN 978-0-374-32540-4
- Signal, Farrar Straus (2009), ISBN 978-0-374-39915-3
- Wild Life, Farrar Straus (2011)
- Fort, Farrar, Straus and Giroux (2015), ISBN 9780374324278

=== Selected children's picture books ===
- Dancing Skeleton, illustrated by Robert Andrew Parker (Atheneum Books, 1989), ISBN 0-02-726452-1 – named a Best Book of the Year by the Library of Congress
- Clever Crow, illus. S. D. Schindler (Atheneum, 1998), ISBN 978-0-689-80671-1
- Cold Feet, illus. Robert Andrew Parker (DK Books for Children, 2000), ISBN 978-0-7894-2636-9. 2001 Boston Globe–Horn Book Award for best picture book
- Casey in the Bath, illus. Farrar Straus Giroux (Macmillan, 1998)ISBN 978-0374410490
