= Executive Order 11850 =

United States executive order

Executive Order 11850 - Renunciation of certain uses in war of chemical herbicides and riot control agents. was signed on April 8, 1975, by United States President Gerald Ford. The executive order restricted the use of herbicides, and riot control agents, including tear gas. Some uses were banned altogether while life-saving uses would require approval. Each and every use authorized would require the explicit approval.

On April 11, 2007 Joseph Benkert, a George W. Bush political appointee, informed the Senate Armed Services Committee that the Bush Presidency felt it could reinterpret the Executive Order and loosen the restriction on the use of gas as a riot control agent.

== See also ==
- Executive Order 13128
- Statement on Chemical and Biological Defense Policies and Programs
