= Michael E. Guest =

American diplomat (born 1957)

Michael Guest
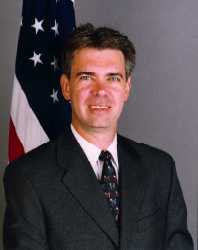

40th United States Ambassador to Romania
- In office September 24, 2001 – July 8, 2004
- President: George W. Bush
- Preceded by: James Rosapepe
- Succeeded by: Jack Crouch

Personal details
- Born: October 26, 1957 (age 69)

Michael E. Guest (born October 26, 1957) is an American diplomat who served as a U.S. Ambassador to Romania during the George W. Bush presidency. Guest was sworn in by U.S. Secretary of State Colin Powell on September 18, 2001, and took up his duties on September 24, 2001. His partner Alex Nevarez was acknowledged by Powell at the swearing-in ceremony in the State Department Diplomatic Reception Room. LGBT rights groups viewed Guest's appointment, and Powell's remarks, as historic and indicative of greater recognition of gay State Department employees and same-sex couples. Socially conservative groups expressed opposition to Guest's appointment and to Powell's gesture.

== Ambassador ==
A Foreign Service officer since 1981, Guest was the first publicly gay man to be confirmed by the U.S. Senate and serve as a U.S. Ambassador. The first publicly gay ambassador, James Hormel, received a recess appointment from Bill Clinton after the Senate failed to confirm his nomination. Guest resided together with Nevarez at the residence of the American Embassy in Bucharest until 2004 when his appointment came to an end. Romania's last anti-gay law, Article 200 of the Penal Code, which criminalised public manifestations of homosexuality, was repealed shortly before Guest's arrival as ambassador in 2001.

During his tenure as ambassador, Guest was outspoken against public corruption, which he said had impeded Romania's development since the fall of communism. At the same time, his ambassadorship was characterized by strong relations between the U.S. and Romania. Romania committed troops to support U.S.-led efforts in Afghanistan and Iraq. Romania was also admitted into NATO and intensified negotiations that would eventually lead to the country's accession into the European Union. President George W. Bush made an official visit to Bucharest in 2002.

Before Guest's departure from Romania at the end of his duties in 2003, then Romanian President Ion Iliescu awarded him the Romanian "Order for Faithful Service in the Rank of Grand Cross" in appreciation for his "high professionalism, dedication to his mission ... and for his personal contribution to the strengthening of the Romanian-American partnership." In April 2003, the National Gay and Lesbian Taskforce recognized him with a Leadership Award, which honors individuals who have made a significant difference in promoting equal rights for lesbian, gay, bisexual and/or transgender people. In 2004, the Department of State awarded him the Charles E. Cobb, Jr. award for Initiative and Success in Trade Development due to his leadership in increasing trade between the U.S. and Romania. In June 2006, the American Foreign Service Association awarded him the Christian Herter Award for Constructive Dissent, for his advocacy on behalf of equality for State Department gay and lesbian employees.

== Retirement ==
Guest retired from the State Department, where he last served as a dean at the Department's Foreign Service Institute. At his retirement ceremony on November 20, 2007, in the Treaty Room, Guest publicly criticized Secretary of State Condoleezza Rice on the issue of discrimination against gay employees and specifically the benefits denied to same-sex partners of department employees. He remarked, "I've felt compelled to choose between obligations to my partner – who is my family – and service to my country. That anyone should have to make that choice is a stain on the Secretary's leadership and a shame for this institution and our country."

In late 2008, Guest was selected as a member of President-elect Barack Obama's transition team at the State Department.

Also in 2008, Guest co-founded the Council for Global Equity (a coalition of human rights and LGBT advocacy organizations seeking U.S. support for LGBT-fair policies abroad), for which he is a senior adviser.

Guest was a co-author of the Dallas Principles, a set of guiding principles toward achieving LGBT equality, drafted in May 2009.

In early 2016, at a Council for Global Equity reception in Washington, D.C., Guest spoke against the anti-immigrant "hateful rhetoric" that Republican candidates had been using on the campaign trail.

In November 2020, Guest was named a volunteer member of the Joe Biden presidential transition Agency Review Team to support transition efforts related to the United States Department of State.

== See also ==
- Gays and Lesbians in Foreign Affairs Agencies (GLIFAA)
- United States Foreign Service
- List of LGBT ambassadors of the United States

Diplomatic posts
Preceded by James Rosapepe	United States Ambassador to Romania; 2001–2004	Succeeded by Jack Dyer Crouch II
