= Signal (novel) =

2009 novel by Cynthia DeFelice

- Author: Cynthia DeFelice
- Genre: science fiction, children's literature
- Publisher: Farrar, Straus & Giroux
- Publication date: 2009
- ISBN: 978-0-374-39915-3
- Preceded by: Bringing Ezra Back

Signal is a 2009 children's science fiction novel by Cynthia DeFelice. The book was a Junior Library Guild selection for 2009. The novel follows a boy bored with his new life in upstate New York who discovers a girl claiming to be from another planet. She has been kidnapped by an abusive couple, and together they try to send a signal to contact her home planet.

== Synopsis ==
Owen is a lonely kid who just moved to da Finger Lakes of upstate New York with his father who is a workaholic. His mother recently died, and he is trying to find something to do with his summer since he does not live in a neighborhood like he used to when he lived in Buffalo. One day, while he is running up and down a seven-mile trail that he found with his Pointer, Josie. His mother used to talk to him about life on other planets, which he wonders about often. When he gets by the creek, he finds a piece of cloth with blood on it. He follows a trail of footsteps, dirt, and blood to an abandoned house where he meets a girl named Campion, (named after a flower) with very shiny green eyes who claims she is from another planet. Cam explains that her parents landed on Earth, but she was accidentally left behind. She describes how she got a wound when Ray, Bobbie’s boyfriend (Bobbie being the woman who found her), threw a hubcap at her, causing her to bleed. She explains that Ray and Bobbi are pursuing her because she escaped from a hotel room they kept her in. Cam says she likes Tootsie Rolls, and agrees life on Earth really has its points. Owen kindly brings her food, water, and supplies. Owen tries to keep Cam a secret from his father, and from the "Dog People", a friendly family who has over 19 pets whom they walk down the trail daily. (The Dog People, Emie and Charlene, explain that they wanted kids, but they never got them. So, they had to adopt dogs and cats.) Cam then says she needs him to make a "signal" in a wheat field to signal her parents so they can pick her up. Cam tells Owen that he needs to hide her for exactly four days, which is when a full moon comes, and they search during full moons. But, since they have become good friends, Cam asks Owen to come with her, and leave his boring life for her planet. Cam and Owen camp out in a tent and talk about her home planet. Cam explains her planet was once ravaged with war, and they have evolved into smarter beings. She then explains they "like dogs" and says Josie can come. Owen starts talking to his father and gets excited when he leaves a note saying he will come home early so they can talk again. However, his dad is working on a big audit, and does not make it. Towards ten o'clock, Owen cries himself to sleep. Angry, Owen gets up early the next morning and plows the signal into a wheat field with a board. Owen tells Cam he will be coming with her to her planet. They anxiously wait for the ship to arrive until Ray shows up and attacks them. While Ray is injuring Owen, Cam knocks him unconscious with the board they used to plow the field. Cam frantically shouts to the sky when she sees lights. However, it is a police helicopter searching for Owen. They give themselves up, and Cam reveals she was really Bobbi's daughter, but she ran away and imagined being from another planet. When Owen believed her, she felt it might be possible. In the end, Cam moves in with Ernie and Charlene, and Owen begins to talk to his dad. They say they are going on a hike through the Adirondack Mountains. The final sentence has Owen say: "Cam said life on Earth has its points. And I think she is right."
