= Jack Dyer Crouch II =

American diplomat

J. D. Crouch II
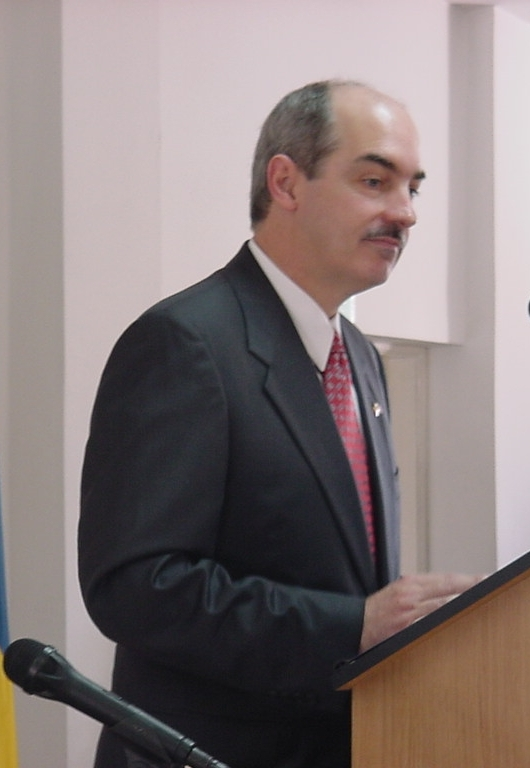
- Crouch in 2009

23rd President and Chief Executive Officer of the United Service Organizations
- In office July 28, 2014 – October 20, 2025
- Preceded by: Sloan D. Gibson
- Succeeded by: Michael Linnington

22nd United States Deputy National Security Advisor
- In office January 31, 2005 – May 4, 2007
- President: George W. Bush
- Preceded by: Stephen Hadley
- Succeeded by: James Franklin Jeffrey

United States Ambassador to Romania
- In office July 16, 2004 – February 28, 2005
- President: George W. Bush
- Preceded by: Michael E. Guest
- Succeeded by: Nicholas F. Taubman

Assistant Secretary of Defense for International Security Policy
- In office August 6, 2001 – October 31, 2003
- President: George W. Bush
- Preceded by: Franklin C. Miller (acting)
- Succeeded by: Peter C. W. Flory

Principal Deputy Assistant Secretary of Defense for International Security Policy
- In office 1990–1992
- President: George H. W. Bush

Personal details
- Born: Jack Dyer Crouch II; July 1, 1958 (age 68)
- Party: Republican
- Parent: Jack D. Crouch (father)
- Education: University of Southern California (BA, MA, PhD)

Jack Dyer Crouch II (born July 1, 1958) is an American diplomat and national security adviser. Between 2014 and October 2025, he served as president and chief executive officer (CEO) of the United Service Organizations (USO).

== Education ==
Crouch earned a Bachelor of Arts, Master of Arts, and PhD in international relations from the University of Southern California.

== Career ==
Between 1984 and 1986, he worked in the Arms Control and Disarmament Agency for the Assistant Director for Strategic Programs and served as an advisor to the United States and Soviet Union Nuclear and Space Arms Talks.

Between 1986 and 1990, he was military legislative assistant to U.S. Senator from Wyoming Malcolm Wallop.

From 1990 to 1992, he served in the administration of U.S. President George H. W. Bush as the Principal Deputy Assistant Secretary of Defense for International Security Policy.

From 1993 to 2001, Crouch was Associate Professor of Defense and Strategic Studies at Southwest Missouri State University, located in Springfield, Missouri. He was a member of the board of editors of Comparative Strategy and a member of the board of advisors of the Center for Security Policy. While at Missouri, he also served as a reserve deputy sheriff in Christian County.

He was appointed Deputy National Security Advisor by U.S. President George W. Bush in March 2005, serving until May 2007. He previously served as the U.S. Ambassador to Romania (from 2004 to 2005) and as the Assistant Secretary of Defense for International Security Policy (from 2001 to 2003), among other positions in government under Republican administrations.

In 2014, Crouch was elected by the United Service Organizations' board of governors to be the president and CEO of the USO. His term started on July 28, 2014.

== See also ==
- List of people from Springfield, Missouri
- List of University of Southern California people

Diplomatic posts
Preceded by Michael E. Guest	United States Ambassador to Romania; 2004–2005	Succeeded by Nicholas F. Taubman
Legal offices
Preceded by Stephen Hadley	Deputy National Security Advisor; 2005–2007	Succeeded by James Jeffrey
Non-profit organization positions
Preceded by Sloan D. Gibson	President and Chief Executive Officer of the United Service Organizations; 2014–2025	Succeeded by Michael Linnington
