= Stephen Hadley =

American attorney and National Security Advisor (born 1947)

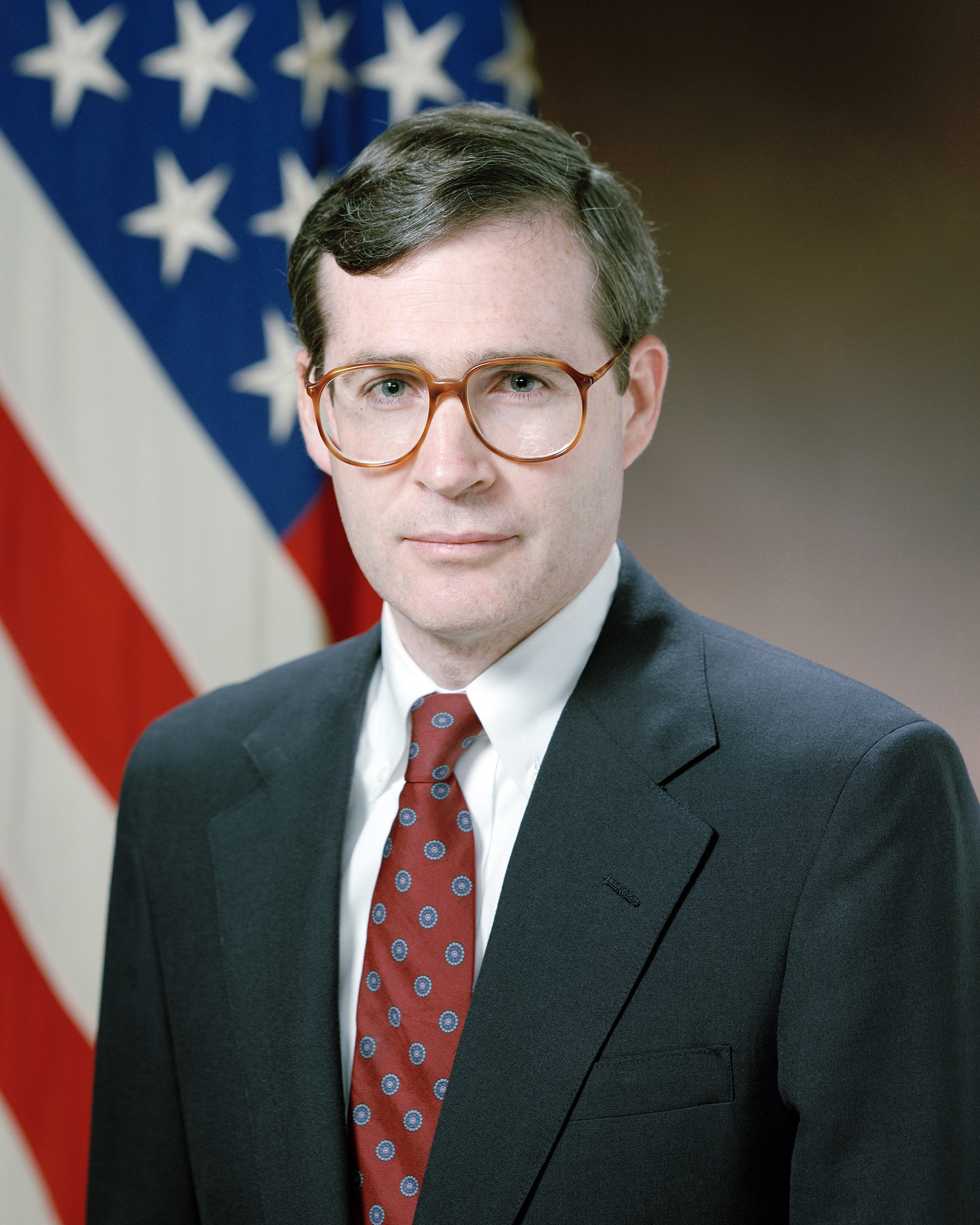
- Official portrait, 1989

20th United States National Security Advisor
- In office January 26, 2005 – January 20, 2009
- President: George W. Bush
- Deputy: Jack Dyer Crouch II; James Franklin Jeffrey
- Preceded by: Condoleezza Rice
- Succeeded by: James L. Jones

21st United States Deputy National Security Advisor
- In office January 20, 2001 – January 26, 2005
- President: George W. Bush
- Preceded by: James Steinberg
- Succeeded by: Jack Dyer Crouch II

3rd Assistant Secretary of Defense for International Security Policy
- In office June 23, 1989 – January 20, 1993
- President: George H. W. Bush
- Preceded by: Ronald F. Lehman
- Succeeded by: Ash Carter

Personal details
- Born: Stephen John Hadley; February 13, 1947 (age 79) Toledo, Ohio, U.S.
- Party: Republican
- Spouse: Ann Hadley
- Children: 2
- Education: Cornell University (BA); Yale University (JD)

Stephen John Hadley (born February 13, 1947) is an American attorney and senior government official who served as the 20th United States National Security Advisor from 2005 to 2009. He served under President George W. Bush during the second term of his administration. Hadley was Deputy National Security Advisor during Bush's first term.

== Early life and education ==
Hadley was born in Toledo, Ohio, the son of Suzanne (née Bentley), a homemaker, and Robert W. Hadley Jr., an electrical engineer. He grew up in South Euclid, Ohio, in the Cleveland metropolitan area. After reading the Allen Drury novel Advise and Consent, he became intrigued by the governing process and was elected student body president of Charles F. Brush High School. Hadley graduated as class valedictorian in 1965.

Hadley received a B.A. degree in government from Cornell University in 1969, where he was a member of Phi Kappa Psi fraternity, the Cornell University Glee Club, and the Quill and Dagger society. He then received a Juris Doctor (J.D.) degree from Yale Law School in 1972 where he was the note and comment editor of the Yale Law Journal. In law school, Hadley was a classmate of Hillary Clinton. He commissioned as an ensign into the U.S. Navy through Yale Naval ROTC in 1972.

== Career ==
=== Military service ===
Hadley served as an officer in the United States Navy from 1972 to 1975. This included being an analyst for the Comptroller of the Department of Defense from 1972 to 1974.

=== Early government service ===
Hadley was a member of the National Security Council staff under President Gerald Ford from 1974 to 1977.

During this period, he worked for the law firm of Shea & Gardner.

From 1986 to 1987, he served as counsel to the Special Review Board established by President Ronald Reagan to inquire into the Iran–Contra affair.

During the administration of George H. W. Bush, Hadley was a Pentagon aide to Paul Wolfowitz, serving as the Assistant Secretary of Defense for International Security Policy from 1989 to 1993. In that position, he had responsibility for defense policy toward NATO and Western Europe, on nuclear weapons and ballistic missile defense, and arms control. He also participated in policy issues involving export control and the use of space. Hadley served as Secretary of Defense Dick Cheney's representative in talks led by Secretary of State James Baker that resulted in the Strategic Arms Reduction Treaties, START I and START II.

=== Private sector work ===
During the years in which the Democratic Clinton administration was in power (1993–2001), Hadley was an administrative partner in the Washington, D.C. law firm of Shea & Gardner, where he had worked earlier in his career. His professional legal practice focused on business problems of U.S. and foreign corporations particularly as they involve international business, regulatory, and strategy issues. These representations included export controls, foreign investment in U.S. national security companies, and the national security responsibilities of U.S. information technology companies.

He was also a principal in The Scowcroft Group, Inc., an international consulting firm. In this, he represented U.S. corporate clients seeking to invest and do business overseas. He serves on the Board of Managers for the Johns Hopkins Applied Physics Laboratory.

=== George W. Bush administration ===
==== Campaign and transition ====
Hadley served as a senior foreign and defense policy adviser to Governor Bush during the 2000 presidential campaign and worked in the Bush-Cheney Transition on the National Security Council.

In January 2001, as George W. Bush prepared to take office, Hadley served on a panel for nuclear weapons issues sponsored by the National Institute for Public Policy, a neoconservative think tank. Other members of the panel included Stephen Cambone, William Schneider, and Robert Joseph. This panel advocated using tactical nuclear weapons as a standard part of the United States defense arsenal.

==== Deputy National Security Advisor ====
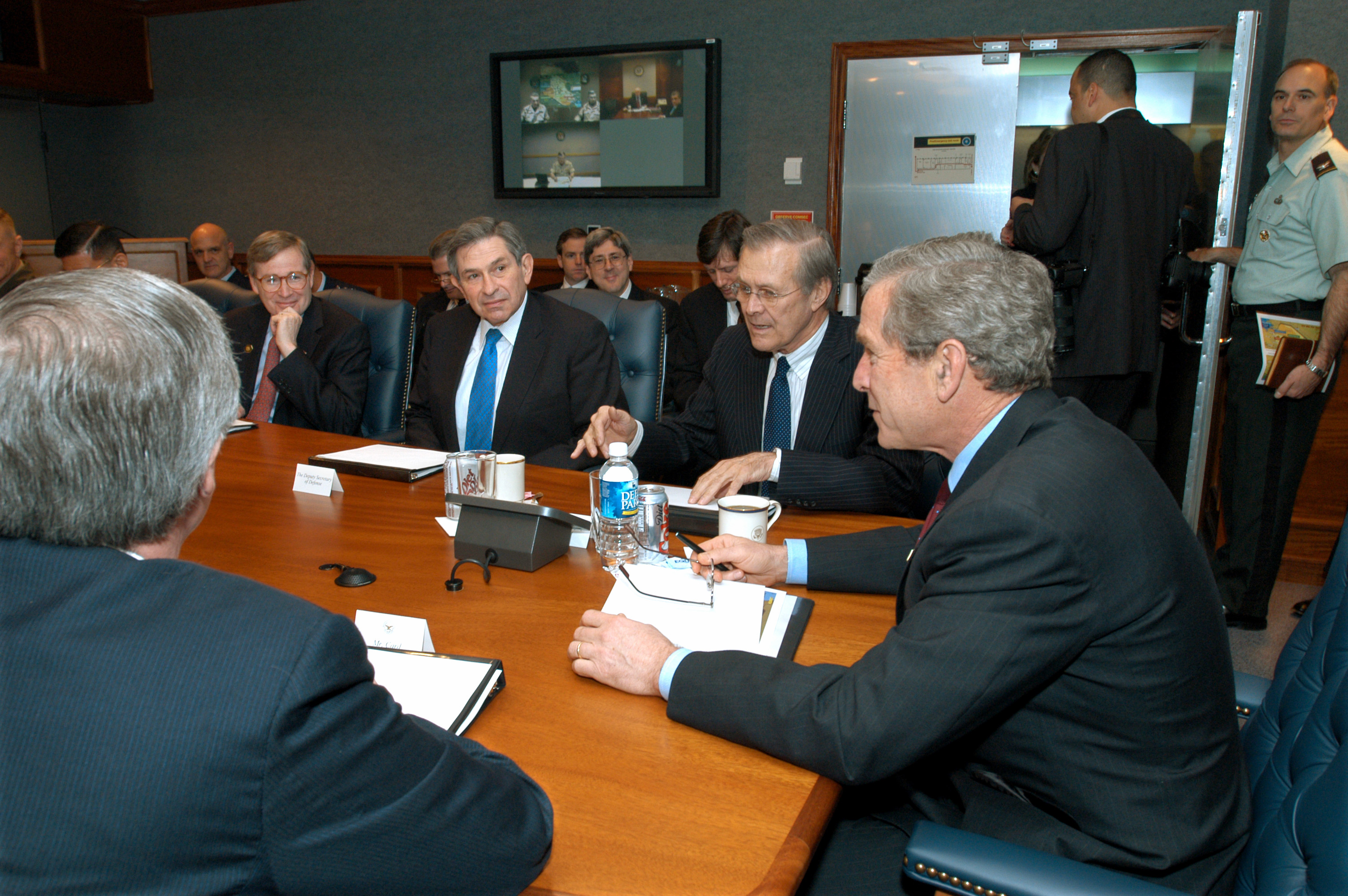
Hadley (far left) along with Wolfowitz, Rumsfeld, and President Bush at a Pentagon meeting in March 2003

He was Assistant to the President and Deputy National Security Advisor from January 22, 2001. In 2002, Hadley was a member of the White House Iraq Group. On Sept. 9, 2002, Nicolò Pollari gave the forged Niger-Gate documents directly to Stephen Hadley. He admitted fault in allowing a disputed claim about Iraq's quest for nuclear weapons material from Niger to be included in Bush's January 28, 2003 State of the Union Address (see Niger uranium forgeries). On July 22, 2003, Hadley offered his resignation to Bush because he had "failed in that responsibility" and that "the high standards the president set were not met." Bush denied Hadley's request. Amid this, The Times of London reported that Hadley was Robert Novak's source for Valerie Plame's name in the CIA leak scandal, but this report proved to be false when Richard Armitage admitted that he was Novak's source.

=== National Security Advisor ===
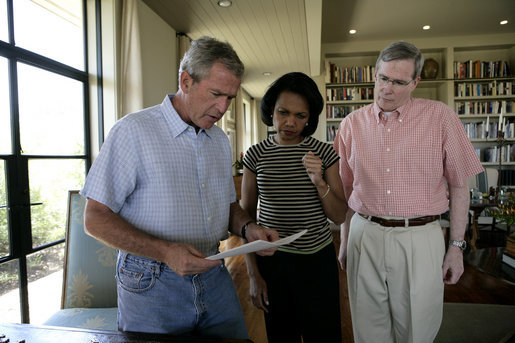
Hadley (right) discussing the 2006 Israel–Lebanon crisis with Bush and Rice

On January 26, 2005, he replaced Condoleezza Rice as National Security Advisor, upon Rice's confirmation as Secretary of State. In that capacity he was the principal White House foreign policy advisor to President Bush, directed the National Security Council staff, and ran the interagency national security policy development and execution process.

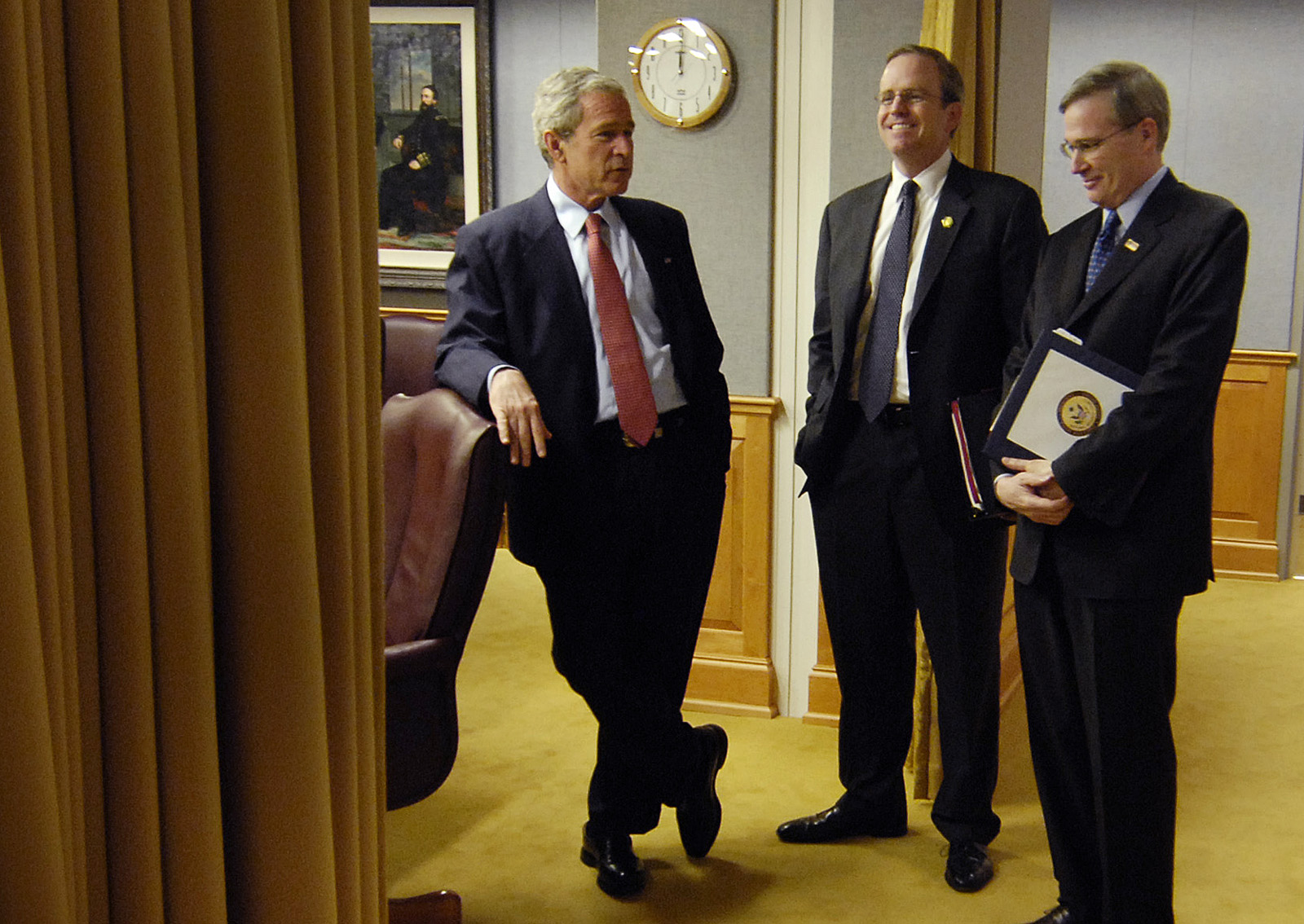
Hadley conferring with President Bush in 2007

In 2007 Hadley led a public media campaign in an effort to convince the public that the proposed Iraq surge would work.

Hadley was known for avoiding focused public attention. In a 2006 profile, The Washington Post described Hadley as "a modest man in an immodest job. In a town populated by people nursing grandiose views of their own importance and scheming for greater glory, Hadley still thinks of himself as a staff man. He sits at the pinnacle of power, but articulates no sweeping personal vision of the world and has made a point of staying in the shadows."

In his book Palestine: Peace Not Apartheid, former president Jimmy Carter recounts that Hadley, in his capacity as national security adviser (Carter calls him by title rather than by name) personally denied Carter permission to visit Syrian president Bashar al-Assad in early 2005, in the wake of the administration's decision to isolate the regime, due its "differences with Syria concerning U.S. policy in Iraq".

He helped steer negotiations with North Korea through the Six-Party Talks, aiming to denuclearize the Korean Peninsula.

=== Later career ===
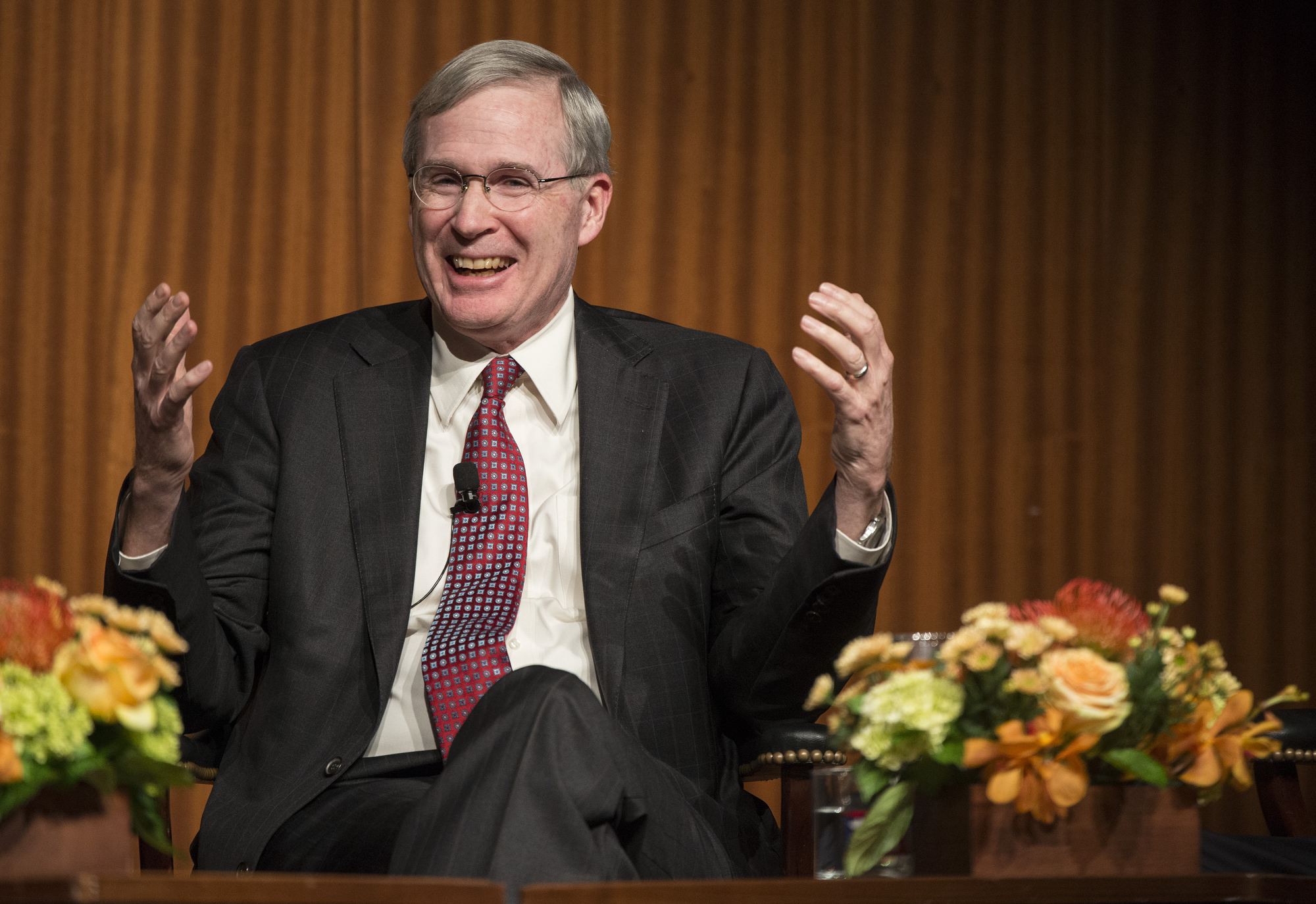
Hadley at the LBJ Presidential Library in 2016

Beginning in 2009, Hadley served as senior adviser for international affairs at the United States Institute of Peace in Washington, DC. On January 24, 2014, he was elected chairman of the Board of Directors of the U.S. Institute of Peace. On September 11, 2018, USIP-based Task Force on Extremism in Fragile States, of which Hadley is a member, produced the report "Beyond the Homeland: Protecting America from Extremism in Fragile States, "which warns that the United States urgently needs a new approach to stem the spread of violent extremism and previews a comprehensive preventative strategy that focuses on strengthening resilience against extremism in fragile states." Hadley widely promoted the Interim Report in the media, including with United States Institute of Peace president Nancy Lindborg on the Foundation for Defense of Democracies' podcast "Foreign Podicy" hosted by Clifford May.

Hadley is a co-founder and principal, along with Condoleezza Rice, Robert Gates and Anja Manuel, in Rice, Hadley, Gates & Manuel, a strategic consulting firm.

In 2013, Hadley was a signatory to an amicus curiae brief submitted to the Supreme Court in support of same-sex marriage during the Hollingsworth v. Perry case.

In March 2013, on the ten year anniversary, Hadley gave his views on what had gone wrong and what had been redeemed in terms of the Iraq War.

During the Syrian chemical weapons crisis in September 2013, Hadley appeared on Bloomberg Television, CNN, MSNBC, Fox News, and also wrote an op-ed piece for The Washington Post in which he advocated attacking Syria with missiles. At the time, Hadley was a director at Raytheon and owned 11,477 shares of stock, but the news organizations failed to disclose the link and conflict of interest.

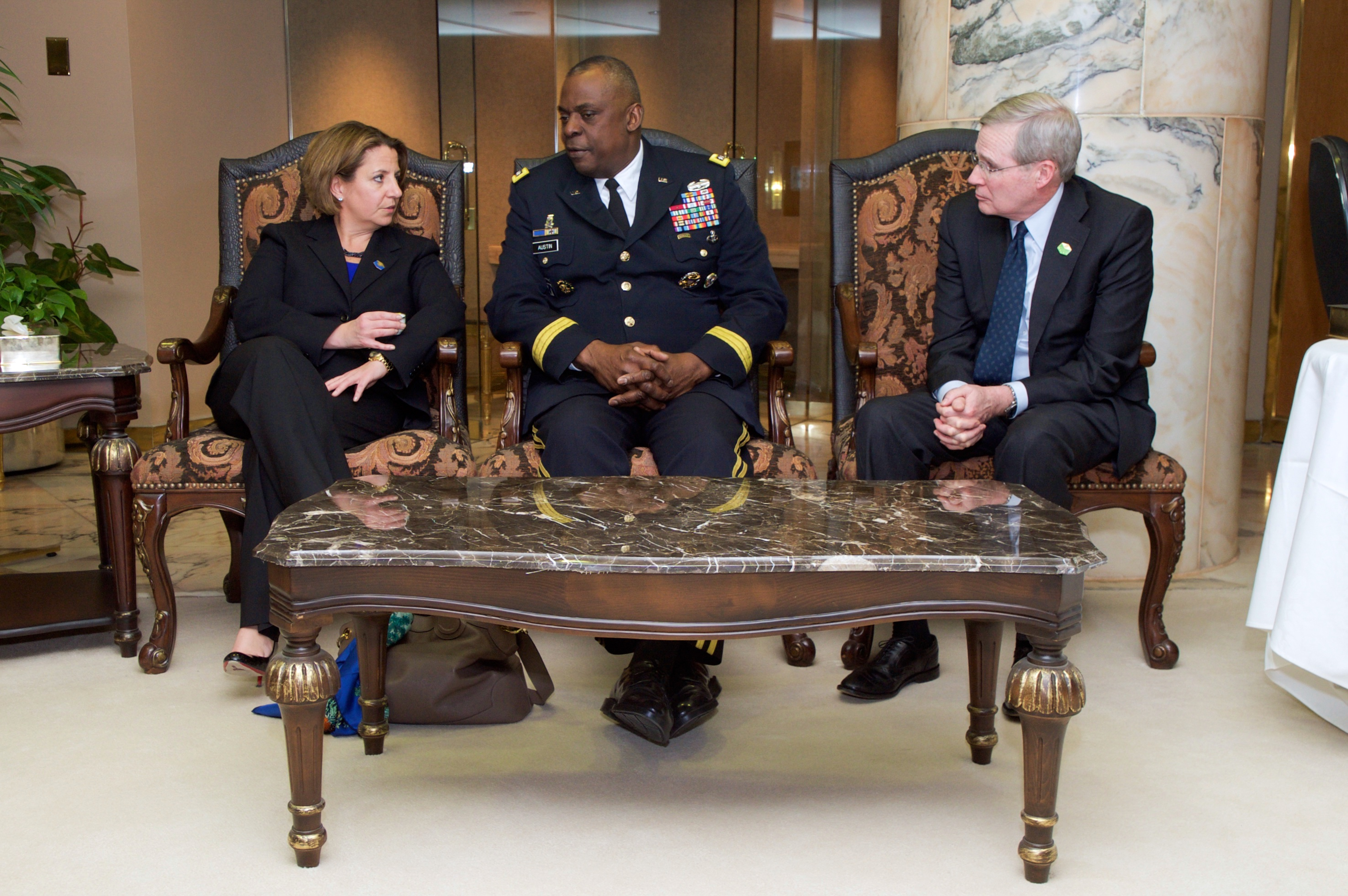
Homeland Security Adviser Lisa Monaco, CENTCOM Commander Army General Lloyd Austin, and former National Security Adviser Stephen Hadley chat at King Khaled International Airport, as they await President Obama's arrival in Riyadh, Saudi Arabia, on January 27, 2015, to extend condolences to the late King Abdullah and call upon and meet with the new King Salman.

Hadley was initially floated as a potential option for Secretary of Defense in the first Trump administration. In this as well as for other positions, it was thought his process knowledge could be beneficial. Instead, in late 2016 he collaborated with former secretary of state Madeleine Albright on a plan for a new course in America's approach to the Middle East.

Hadley is a member of the Council on Foreign Relations. He has been a member of the Defense Policy Board, the Foreign Affairs Policy Board, the National Security Advisory Panel to the director of Central Intelligence, and the board of trustees of Analytical Services ("ANSER").

Hadley is also an executive vice chair on the board of directors at the Atlantic Council and is on the board of directors at defense contractor Raytheon.

On January 14, 2024, a U.S. delegation composed of Hadley and James Steinberg arrived in Taipei in the aftermath of Taiwan's 2024 presidential election.

== Personal life ==
Hadley lives in Washington, D.C., with his wife Ann, a Justice Department lawyer. They have two daughters.

== Honours ==
- Grand Cordon of the Order of the Rising Sun, 2017

== Publications ==
=== Articles ===
- Americans Need Domestic Unity for Effective Foreign Policy, Foreign Policy, February 5, 2024 (co-authored with Richard Fontaine)

Political offices
Preceded by Ronald F. Lehman	Assistant Secretary of Defense for Global Strategic Affairs; 1989–1993	Succeeded by Ash Carter
Preceded by James Steinberg	Deputy National Security Advisor; 2001–2005	Succeeded by Jack Dyer Crouch II
Preceded by Condoleezza Rice	National Security Advisor; 2005–2009	Succeeded by James L. Jones
