= Franklin Miller =

American government official

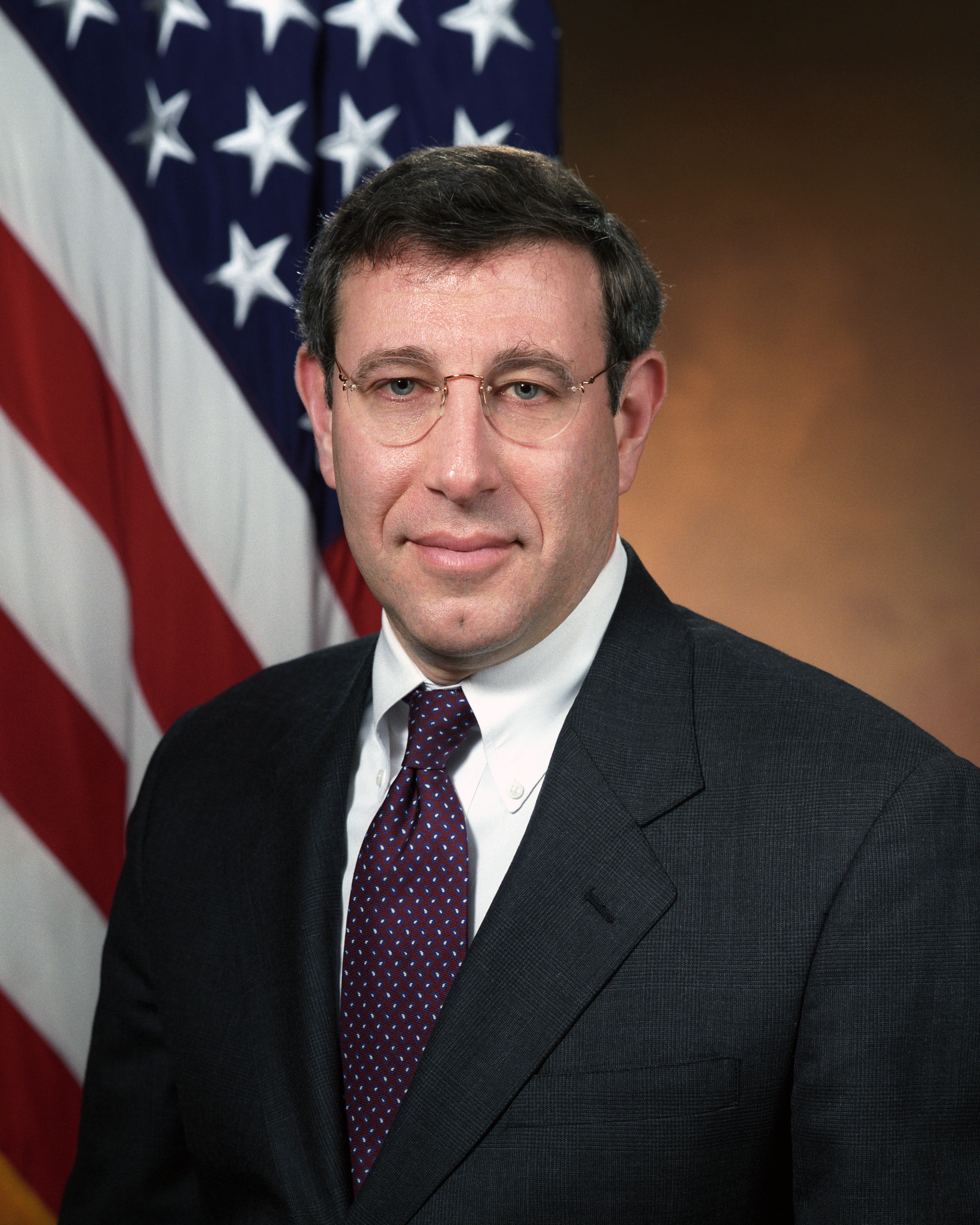
Franklin Miller in October 1996

Franklin Carroll Miller (born 1950) is a foreign policy and nuclear defense policy expert. Miller served 31 years in the U.S. government, including the Department of State, the Department of Defense and as a Special Assistant to President George W. Bush. He is principal at the Washington-based international business advisory firm The Scowcroft Group.

== Education ==
Miller attended Williams College and graduated (Phi Beta Kappa) in 1972 with highest honors in political science and honors in history. Following graduation from Williams, he joined the U.S. Navy and served three years on board USS Joseph Hewes (DE-1078) as communications officer and then as the ship's anti-submarine warfare officer. He earned the surface warfare officer designator while on the Hewes. Following active duty, Miller attended Princeton University's Woodrow Wilson School of Public and International Affairs, earning a Master of Public Affairs (MPA) degree in 1977. During his time as a graduate student, Miller served in the naval reserve and was assigned to the Philadelphia-based destroyer USS Johnston (DD-821).

== Career ==
Immediately following graduation from Princeton, Miller joined the U.S. Department of State as a political-military affairs officer, a post he held until the summer of 1979. He then joined the Theater Nuclear Policy Office in the Office of the Secretary of Defense (OSD), a post he held for two years. In late 1981 he was promoted to head OSD's Strategic Forces Policy office. He held this post for eight years, during which he had unusual influence on the evolution of US deterrence policy and on US nuclear targeting policy.

During this period he also forged new and important relationships between the Department of Defense and the United Kingdom Ministry of Defence.

Miller has been called "the father and the architect of the U.S.- U.K. dialogue on nuclear weapons policy." In 1985, under Miller's leadership as Director of nuclear targeting for the Office of the Secretary of Defense, Miller constructed the open and close collaboration between the British and American military on nuclear defense and oversaw its expansion and evolution for two decades.

Miller was promoted to the position of Deputy Assistant Secretary of Defense for Nuclear Forces and Arms Control Policy in the fall of 1989. In addition to continuing his pioneering work in nuclear deterrence and targeting policy and in US-UK interaction, Mr. Miller played a significant role in the completion of the START 1 treaty, in the 1991 Presidential Nuclear Initiatives, and in the creation of the START 2 treaty.

In 1993 Miller was promoted to be the Principal Deputy Assistant Secretary of Defense (International Security Policy). In September 1996 he became the Acting Assistant Secretary (ISP), a post he held for fourteen months. In November 1997, he became the Principal Deputy Assistant Secretary for Strategy and Threat Reduction, a newly created organization. He became Acting Assistant Secretary for Strategy and Threat Reduction in October 2000 and held that post until January 20, 2001. During the period September 1996 through January 2001 Miller served concurrently as chairman of NATO's nuclear policy committee, the "High Level Group" (HLG).

In late January 2001 Miller joined the White House staff as a special assistant to President George W. Bush and as the senior director for defense policy and arms control on the National Security Council (NSC) staff. He retired from the U.S. Government in March 2005 with an accumulated 31 years of federal service. Dan Plesch of the Royal United Services Institute called Miller a "high priest of nuclear theology," for his backing of a traditional deterrence policy the number of warheads the UK and US maintain should be calculated according to the number of potential targets.

Miller's first post-government employment was with The Cohen Group, a Washington-based international business consulting firm. In August 2010 he became a principal at the Scowcroft Group. He also is a non-resident senior advisor at the Center for Strategic and International Studies (CSIS). He served on the board of directors of the Charles Stark Draper Laboratory from 2009 to 2018 and was Board Chairman from 2013 to 2018. He served twice on the Board of Directors of Sandia National Laboratory. He currently serves on the Board of Directors of AirBusUS Defense and Space. Miller also served pro bono on a number of U.S. Government advisory boards.

Miller was a member of three major US Government Commissions: the 2008 Secretary of Defense Task Force on DOD Nuclear Weapons Management (The Schlesinger Panel); the 2013-2014 Congressional Advisory Panel on the Governance of the Nuclear Security Enterprise (Mies-Augustine Panel); and the 2022-2023 Congressionally-mandated Strategic Posture Commission.

He publishes frequently on defense and national security issues.

== Honors and awards ==
U.S.:

- Department of Defense Distinguished Civilian Service Medal (five awards)
- Department of Defense Distinguished Public Service Medal
- Department of State Distinguished Honor Medal
- Department of the Navy Distinguished Public Service Medal
- Chairman, Joint Chiefs of Staff Joint Distinguished Civilian Service Medal
- National Nuclear Security Administration Administrator’s Gold Medal for Distinguished Service
- Defense Intelligence Agency Director’s Medal
- Naval Submarine League Distinguished Civilian Award
- Lawrence Livermore National Laboratory, “2024 John S. Foster Award and Gold Medal”

Allied:

- Knight Commander of the Order of the British Empire (Honorary)
- Grand Officer, Norwegian Royal Order of Merit
- Officer, French Legion of Honor
- Japanese Order of the Rising Sun
