= United Nations Disarmament Commission =

United Nations body dealing with disarmament

- Abbreviation: UNDC
- Formation: First Iteration: 11 January 1952 (74 years ago); Second Iteration: 30 June 1978 (48 years ago)
- Type: General Assembly Commission
- Legal status: Active
- Headquarters: United Nations Headquarters
- Chair: José Pereira (Paraguay) (2025 session)
- Parent organization: United Nations General Assembly
- Website: UNDC Website

The United Nations Disarmament Commission (UNDC) is a United Nations commission established by the United Nations General Assembly which primarily deals with issues relating to disarmament. The UNDC is serviced substantively by the Office for Disarmament Affairs and technically by the Department of General Assembly Affairs and Conference Management. The commission was first established on 11 January 1952, and was re-established in its current form on 30 June 1978.

== History ==
The United Nations Disarmament Commission was first established on 11 January 1952 by United Nations General Assembly Resolution 502 (VI). The commission was put under the jurisdiction of the United Nations Security Council and its mandate included: preparing proposals for a treaty for the regulation, limitation and balanced reduction of all armed forces and all armaments, including the elimination of all weapons of mass destruction.

However, this commission only met a few times, and was followed by a succession of other disarmament-focused bodies: the Ten-Nation Disarmament Committee (1960), the Eighteen Nation Committee on Disarmament (1962), the Conference of the Committee on Disarmament (1969) and, finally, the Conference on Disarmament (1979), which still meets to this day.

The second iteration of the commission was formed on 30 June 1978 by the General Assembly as a subsidiary organ of the Assembly as per S-10/2. It is a deliberative body, whose mandate is considering and making recommendations on various issues in the field of disarmament. Because of its deliberative nature, the UNDC has traditionally focused on a limited number of agenda items at each session, typically three or four. In 1998, this tendency was made official by the General assembly, who through decision 52/492, limited the work of the UNDC to "two agenda items per year from the whole range of disarmament issues, including one on nuclear disarmament." Additionally, each topic is considered in the UNDC for a three-year period. Each session, working groups are created, the number of which is dependent on the number of agenda items being discussed by the body.

Although the UNDC's goal is to formulate principles, guidelines and recommendations for the General Assembly's approval, it was unable to adopt any formulation due to its members being unable to agree on any substantial outcome.

== Activities ==
The UNDC meets for three weeks each spring, operating through plenary meetings and working groups. Each of the UN's five geographical groups take turns in assuming the chairmanship of the UNDC and its working groups.

In 2017, as part of the General Assembly's seventy-second Session, the commission adopted "Recommendations on practical confidence-building measures in the field of conventional weapons" as proposed by Working Group II of that session.

In 2023, as part of the General Assembly's seventy-eighth Session, the commission adopted "Recommendations to promote the practical implementation of transparency and confidence-building measures in outer space activities with the goal of preventing an arms race in outer space, in accordance with the recommendations set out in the report of the Group of Governmental Experts on Transparency and Confidence-Building Measures in Outer Space Activities” as proposed by Working Group II of that session.

In 2025, as part of the General Assembly's eightieth Session, the Commission noted to the General Assembly an interest having full web-based coverage of its plenary meetings through United Nations WebTV and "noted the Chair's intention to explore the matter with the Secretariat and the Bureau in order to address the current lack of webcasting of such plenary meetings".

== See also ==
- Disarmament
- United Nations Office for Disarmament Affairs
- United Nations General Assembly
