= Conference on disarmament (disambiguation) =

Conference on disarmament or disarmament conference may refer to:

- Conference for the Reduction and Limitation of Armaments (Geneva, 1932–1934)
- Conference on Disarmament, an international forum to negotiate multilateral arms control and disarmament agreements established in 1979
- Conference of the Committee on Disarmament

== See also ==
- Arms control
