= Arms control =

Term for international restriction of weapons

Arms control is a term for international restrictions upon the development, production, stockpiling, proliferation and usage of small arms, conventional weapons, and weapons of mass destruction. Arms control is typically exercised through the use of diplomacy which seeks to impose such limitations upon consenting participants through international treaties and agreements, although it may also comprise efforts by a nation or group of nations to enforce limitations upon a non-consenting country.

== Enactment ==
Arms control treaties and agreements are often seen as a way to avoid costly arms races which could prove counter-productive to national aims and future peace. Some are used as ways to stop the spread of certain military technologies (such as nuclear weaponry or missile technology) in return for assurances to potential developers that they will not be victims of those technologies. Additionally, some arms control agreements are entered to limit the damage done by warfare, especially to civilians and the environment, which is seen as bad for all participants regardless of who wins a war.

While arms control treaties are seen by many peace proponents as a key tool against war, by the participants, they are often seen simply as ways to limit the high costs of the development and building of weapons, and even reduce the costs associated with war itself. Arms control can even be a way of maintaining the viability of military action by limiting those weapons that would make war so costly and destructive as to make it no longer a viable tool for national policy.

== Enforcement ==
Enforcement of arms control agreements has proven difficult over time. Most agreements rely on the continued desire of the participants to abide by the terms to remain effective. Usually, when a nation no longer desires to abide by the terms, they usually will seek to either covertly circumvent the terms or to end their participation in the treaty. This was seen with the Washington Naval Treaty (and the subsequent London Naval Treaty), where most participants sought to work around the limitations, some more legitimately than others. The United States developed better technology to get better performance from their ships while still working within the weight limits, the United Kingdom exploited a loop-hole in the terms, the Italians misrepresented the weight of their vessels, and when up against the limits, Japan left the treaty. The nations which violated the terms of the treaty did not suffer great consequences for their actions. Within little more than a decade, the treaty was abandoned. The Geneva Protocol has lasted longer and been more successful at being respected, but still nations have violated it at will when they have felt the need. Enforcement has been haphazard, with measures more a matter of politics than adherence to the terms. This meant sanctions and other measures tended to be advocated against violators primarily by their natural political enemies, while violations have been ignored or given only token measures by their political allies.

More recent arms control treaties have included more stringent terms on enforcement of violations as well as verification. This last has been a major obstacle to effective enforcement, as violators often attempt to covertly circumvent the terms of the agreements. Verification is the process of determining whether or not a nation is complying with the terms of an agreement, and involves a combination of release of such information by participants as well as some way to allow participants to examine each other to verify that information. This often involves as much negotiation as the limits themselves, and in some cases questions of verification have led to the breakdown of treaty negotiations (for example, verification was cited as a major concern by opponents of the Comprehensive Test Ban Treaty, ultimately not ratified by the United States).

States may remain in a treaty while seeking to break the limits of that treaty as opposed to withdrawing from it. This is for two major reasons. To openly defy an agreement, even if one withdraws from it, often is seen in a bad light politically and can carry diplomatic repercussions. Additionally, if one remains in an agreement, competitors who are also participatory may be held to the limitations of the terms, while withdrawal releases your opponents to make the same developments you are making, limiting the advantage of that development.

== Theory of arms control ==
Scholars and practitioners such as John D. Steinbruner, Thomas Schelling, Morton Halperin, Jonathan Dean or Stuart Croft worked extensively on the theoretical backing of arms control. Arms control is meant to break the security dilemma. It aims at mutual security between partners and overall stability (be it in a crisis situation, a grand strategy, or stability to put an end to an arms race). Other than stability, arms control comes with cost reduction and damage limitation. It is different from disarmament since the maintenance of stability might allow for mutually controlled armament and does not take a peace-without-weapons-stance. Nevertheless, arms control is a defensive strategy in principle, since transparency, equality, and stability do not fit into an offensive strategy.

According to a 2020 study in the American Political Science Review, arms control is rare because successful arms control agreements involve a difficult trade-off between transparency and security. For arms control agreements to be effective, there needs to be a way to thoroughly verify that a state is following the agreement, such as through intrusive inspections. However, states are often reluctant to submit to such inspections when they have reasons to fear that the inspectors will use the inspections to gather information about the capabilities of the state, which could be used in a future conflict.

== History ==
=== Pre-19th century ===
One of the first recorded attempts in arms control was a set of rules laid down in ancient Greece by the Amphictyonic Leagues. Rulings specified how war could be waged, and breaches of this could be punished by fines or by war.

In the 8th and 9th centuries AD, swords and chain mail armor manufactured in the Frankish empire were highly sought after for their quality, and Charlemagne (r. 768–814), made their sale or export to foreigners illegal, punishable by forfeiture of property or even death. This was an attempt to limit the possession and use of this equipment by the Franks' enemies, including the Moors, the Vikings and the Slavs.

The church used its position as a trans-national organization to limit the means of warfare. The 989 Peace of God (extended in 1033) ruling protected noncombatants, agrarian and economic facilities, and the property of the church from war. The 1027 Truce of God also tried to prevent violence between Christians. The Second Lateran Council in 1139 prohibited the use of crossbows against other Christians, although it did not prevent its use against non-Christians.

The development of firearms led to an increase in the devastation of war. The brutality of wars during this period led to efforts to formalize the rules of war, with humane treatment for prisoners of war or wounded, as well as rules to protect non-combatants and the pillaging of their property. However, during the period until the beginning of the 19th century few formal arms control agreements were recorded, except theoretical proposals and those imposed on defeated armies.

One treaty which was concluded was the Strasbourg Agreement of 1675. This is the first international agreement limiting the use of chemical weapons, in this case, poison bullets. The treaty was signed between France and The Holy Roman Empire

=== 19th century ===
The 1817 Rush–Bagot Treaty between the United States and the United Kingdom was the first arms control treaty of what can be considered the modern industrial era, leading to the demilitarization of the Great Lakes and Lake Champlain region of North America. This was followed by the 1871 Treaty of Washington which led to total demilitarization.

The industrial revolution led to the increasing mechanization of warfare, as well as rapid advances in the development of firearms; the increased potential of devastation (which was later seen in the battlefields of World War I) led to Tsar Nicholas II of Russia calling together the leaders of 26 nations for the First Hague Conference in 1899. The Conference led to the signing of the Hague Convention of 1899 that led to rules of declaring and conducting warfare as well as the use of modern weaponry, and also led to the setting up of the Permanent Court of Arbitration.

=== 1900 to 1945 ===
A Second Hague Conference was called in 1907 leading to additions and amendments to the original 1899 agreement. A Third Hague Conference was called for 1915, but this was abandoned due to the First World War.

After the World War I, the League of Nations was set up which attempted to limit and reduce arms. However the enforcement of this policy was not effective. Various naval conferences, such as the Washington Naval Conference, were held during the period between the First and Second World Wars to limit the number and size of major warships of the five great naval powers.

The 1925 Geneva Conference led to the banning of chemical weapons being deployed against enemy nationals in international armed conflict as part of the Geneva Protocol. The 1928 Kellogg-Briand Pact, whilst ineffective, attempted for "providing for the renunciation of war as an instrument of national policy".

=== Since 1945 ===
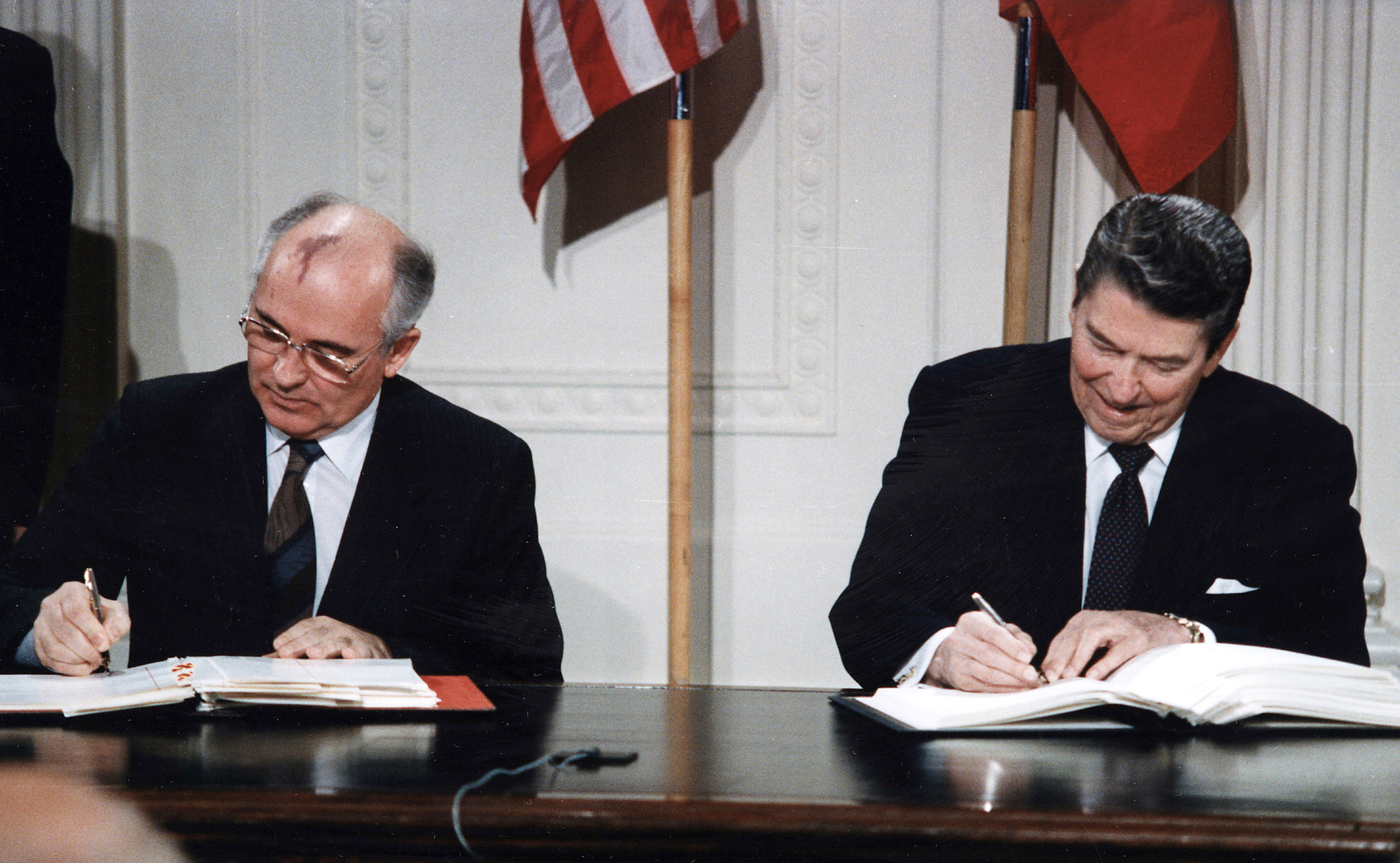
Soviet General Secretary Gorbachev and U.S. President Reagan signing the INF Treaty in 1987

After World War II, the United Nations was set up as a body to promote and to maintain international peace and security. The United States proposed the Baruch Plan in 1946 as a way to impose stringent international control over the nuclear fuel cycle and thereby avert a global nuclear arms race, but the Soviet Union rejected the proposal and negotiations failed. Following President Eisenhower's 1953 Atoms for Peace speech to the UN General Assembly, the International Atomic Energy Agency was set up in 1957 to promote peaceful uses of nuclear technology and apply safeguards against the diversion of nuclear material from peaceful uses to nuclear weapons.

Under the auspices of the United Nations, the Partial Test Ban Treaty, which aimed to end nuclear weapons testing in the atmosphere, underwater and in outer-space, was established in 1963. The 1968 Nuclear Non-Proliferation Treaty (NPT) was signed to prevent further spread of nuclear weapons technology to countries outside the five that already possessed them: the United States, the Soviet Union, the United Kingdom, France and China. With the three main goals of establishing nonproliferation with inspections, nuclear arms reduction, and the right to use nuclear energy peacefully, this treaty initially met some reluctance from countries developing their own nuclear programs such as Brazil, Argentina and South Africa. Still, all countries with the exception of India, Israel, Pakistan and South Sudan decided to sign or ratify the document.

The Strategic Arms Limitation Talks (SALT) between the United States and Soviet Union in the late 1960s/early 1970s led to further weapons control agreements. The SALT I talks led to the Anti-Ballistic Missile Treaty and an Interim Strategic Arms Limitation Agreement (see SALT I), both in 1972. The SALT II talks started in 1972 leading to agreement in 1979. Due to the Soviet Union's invasion of Afghanistan the United States never ratified the treaty, but the agreement was honoured by both sides.

The Intermediate-Range Nuclear Forces Treaty was signed between the United States and Soviet Union in 1987 and ratified in 1988, leading to an agreement to destroy all missiles with ranges from 500 to 5,500 kilometers. This came in the context of a revitalised peace movement during the previous decade which included huge demonstrations around the world for nuclear disarmament.

The 1993 Chemical Weapons Convention was signed banning the manufacture and use of chemical weapons.

The Strategic Arms Reduction Treaties were signed, as START I and START II, by the US and Soviet Union, further restricting weapons. This was further moved on by the Treaty on Strategic Offensive Reductions, which was in turn superseded by the New START Treaty.

UN vote on adoption of the Treaty on the Prohibition of Nuclear Weapons on 7 July 2017 Yes

The Comprehensive Test Ban Treaty was signed in 1996 banning all nuclear explosions in all environments, for military or civilian purposes, but it has not entered into force due to the non-ratification of eight specific states.

In 1998 the United Nations founded the United Nations Office for Disarmament Affairs (UNODA). Its goal is to promote nuclear disarmament and non-proliferation and the strengthening of the disarmament regimes in respect to other weapons of mass destruction, chemical and biological weapons. It also promotes disarmament efforts in the area of conventional weapons, especially landmines and small arms, which are often the weapons of choice in contemporary conflicts.

In addition to treaties focused primarily on stopping the proliferation of nuclear weapons, there has been a recent movement to regulate the sale and trading of conventional weapons. As of December 2014, the United Nations is preparing for entry into force of the Arms Trade Treaty, which has been ratified by 89 nations. However, it is currently missing ratification by key arms producers such as Russia and China, and while the United States has signed the treaty it has not yet ratified it. The Treaty regulates the international trade in almost all categories of conventional weapons – from small arms to battle tanks, combat aircraft and warships. Ammunition, as well as parts and components, are also covered.

More recently, the United Nations announced the adoption of the Treaty on the Prohibition of Nuclear Weapons in 2020, following the 50th ratification or accession by member states.

== List of treaties and conventions related to arms control ==
Some of the more important international arms control agreements follow:

- Treaty of Versailles, 1919 – limited the size of the Germany's military after World War I
- Washington Naval Treaty, 1922–1939 (Note: The last naval conference treaty was to expire de jure in 1942, but in fact it ceased to be enforced with the start of World War II.) (as part of the naval conferences) – set limitations on construction of battleships, battlecruisers, and aircraft carriers as well as tonnage quotas on cruisers, destroyers, and submarines between the United States, the United Kingdom, Japan, France, and Italy
- Geneva Protocol, 1925 – prohibited the use of biological and chemical weapons against enemy nationals in international armed conflict
- Antarctic Treaty, signed 1959, entered into force 1961 – prohibited military conflict in Antarctica
- Partial Test Ban Treaty, signed and entered into force 1963 – prohibited nuclear weapons testing in the atmosphere
- Outer Space Treaty, signed and entered into force 1967 – prohibited deployment of weapons of mass destruction, including nuclear weapons, in space
- Nuclear Non-Proliferation Treaty, signed 1968, entered into force 1970 – prohibited countries without nuclear weapons from acquiring them while committing nuclear-armed states to eventual disarmament
- Seabed Arms Control Treaty, signed 1971, entered into force 1972 – prohibited underwater nuclear tests
- Strategic Arms Limitation Treaty (SALT I), signed and ratified 1972, in force 1972–1977 – limited introduction of new intercontinental ballistic missile launchers and submarine-launched ballistic missiles
- Anti-Ballistic Missile Treaty, signed and entered into force 1972, terminated following U.S. withdrawal 2002 – restricted anti-ballistic missiles
- Biological Weapons Convention, signed 1972, entered into force 1975 – prohibited production of biological weapons
- Threshold Test Ban Treaty, signed 1974, entered into force 1990 – limited nuclear weapons tests to 150 kilotons
- SALT II signed 1979, never entered into force – limited production of long-range and intercontinental ballistic missiles
- Environmental Modification Convention, signed 1977, entered into force 1978 – prohibited military use of environmental modification techniques
- Convention on Certain Conventional Weapons, signed 1980, entered into force 1983 – restricted certain conventional weapons such as landmines, incendiary weapons, and laser weapons as well as requiring clearance of unexploded ordnances.
- Moon Treaty, signed 1979, entered into force 1984 (Note: The Moon Treaty entered into force in 1984, but the great majority of states have neither signed nor ratified it, including the major spacefaring nations.) – prohibits militarization of the Moon
- Intermediate-Range Nuclear Forces Treaty (INF Treaty), signed 1987, entered into force 1988, United States and Russia announced withdrawal 2019 – limited short-range and intermediate-range ballistic missiles
- Treaty on Conventional Armed Forces in Europe, (CFE Treaty) signed 1990, entered into force 1992 (Note: Post–Cold War Amendments to the CFE Treaty were agreed in 1996, but never entered into force. Russia announced its intended suspension of the treaty in 2007.) – established limits on deployment of conventional military forces in Europe between NATO and the Warsaw Pact
- Vienna Document, adopted 1990, updated 1992, 1994, 1999, 2011 – European agreement on confidence- and security-building measures such as prior notification of military force activities and inspections of military activities
- Strategic Arms Reduction Treaty I (START I), signed 1991, entered into force 1994, expired 2009 (START I was a successor to the expired SALT agreements.) – provided limitations on strategic offensive arms
- Chemical Weapons Convention, signed 1993, entered into force 1997 – prohibited production and stockpiling of chemical weapons
- START II, signed 1993, ratified 1996 (United States) and 2000 (Russia), terminated following Russian withdrawal 2002 – prohibited intercontinental ballistic missiles with multiple independently targetable reentry vehicles
- Open Skies Treaty, signed 1992, entered into force 2002 – allowed unarmed reconnaissance flights between NATO and Russia
- Comprehensive Nuclear-Test-Ban Treaty, signed 1996, has not entered into force. – prohibited nuclear weapons testing
- Ottawa Treaty on anti-personnel landmines, signed 1997, entered into force 1999 (Note: The largest producers of anti-personnel land mines, China, Russia and the United States, have not adhered to the Ottawa Treaty on land mines.)
- Strategic Offensive Reductions Treaty (SORT), signed 2002, entered into force 2003, expires 2012 – limited nuclear warheads
- International Code of Conduct against Ballistic Missile Proliferation, signed 2002 – limited proliferation of ballistic missiles
- Convention on Cluster Munitions, signed 2008, entered into force 2010 – prohibits deployment, production, and stockpiling of cluster bombs
- New START Treaty, signed by Russia and the United States April 2010, entered into force February 2011 – reduced strategic nuclear missiles by half
- Arms Trade Treaty, concluded 2013, entered into force 24 December 2014 – regulates trade of conventional weapons
- Treaty on the Prohibition of Nuclear Weapons, signed 2017, entered into force January 2021 – prohibits nuclear weapons

=== Nuclear weapon-free zone treaties ===
- Treaty of Tlatelolco (Latin America and the Caribbean), signed 1967, entered into force 1972
- Treaty of Rarotonga (South Pacific), signed 1985, entered into force 1986
- Treaty of Bangkok (Southeast Asia), signed 1995, entered into force 1997
- Treaty of Pelindaba (Africa), signed 1996, entered into force 2009
- Treaty of Semipalatinsk (Central Asia), signed 2006, entered into force 2008

Other treaties also envision the creation of NWFZ, among other objectives. These are the following:

- Antarctic Treaty, signed 1959, entered into force 1961
- Outer Space Treaty, signed and entered into force 1967
- Seabed Arms Control Treaty, signed 1971, entered into force 1972

=== Treaties not entered into force ===
- Comprehensive Test Ban Treaty, signed 1996 – prohibits nuclear weapons testing

=== Proposed treaties ===
- Fissile Material Cut-off Treaty – would prohibit all further production of fissile material
- Nuclear weapons convention – would prohibit nuclear weapons

=== Export control regimes ===
- Zangger Committee since 1971
- Nuclear Suppliers Group (NSG) since 1974
- Australia Group since 1985
- Missile Technology Control Regime (MTCR), since 1987
- Wassenaar Arrangement, since 1996

=== Nonbinding declarations ===
- Ayacucho Declaration 1974

=== Ongoing discussions ===
- Group of Governmental Experts on Lethal Autonomous Weapons Systems

== Arms control organizations ==
Intergovernmental organizations for arms control include:

- International Atomic Energy Agency (IAEA)
- Organisation for the Prohibition of Chemical Weapons (OPCW)
- Organization for Security and Cooperation in Europe (OSCE) which has other functions besides arms control
- Preparatory Commission for the Comprehensive Nuclear-Test-Ban Treaty Organization (CTBTO PrepCom)
- Conference on Disarmament (CD)
- United Nations Office for Disarmament Affairs (UNODA)
- United Nations Institute for Disarmament Research (UNIDIR)
- the now disbanded United Nations Monitoring, Verification and Inspection Commission (UNMOVIC), the successor to United Nations Special Commission (UNSCOM)
- failed proposal for Organisation for the Prohibition of Biological Weapons

There are also numerous non-governmental organizations that promote a global arms reduction and offer research and analysis about (US) nuclear weapons policy. These include:

- Arms Control Association, founded in 1971 to promote public understanding of and support for arms control.
- Federation of American Scientists (FAS)—founded in 1945 as the Federation of Atomic Scientists by veterans of the Manhattan Project
- Campaign for Nuclear Disarmament—a leading disarmament organization in the United Kingdom, founded in 1957
- Peace Action—formerly SANE (the Committee for a Sane Nuclear Policy), founded in 1957
- Physicians for Social Responsibility (PSR)—founded by Bernard Lown in 1961
- Council for a Livable World—founded in 1962 by physicist Leó Szilárd and other scientists who believed that nuclear weapons should be controlled and eventually eliminated
- Stockholm International Peace Research Institute (SIPRI)—founded in 1966
- Union of Concerned Scientists (UCS)—founded in 1969 by faculty and students at the Massachusetts Institute of Technology
- Arms Control Association—founded in 1971
- Center for Arms Control and Non-Proliferation—founded in 1980 as a sister organization to the Council for a Livable World
- International Physicians for the Prevention of Nuclear War (IPPNW)—founded in 1981
- Alliance for Nuclear Accountability—a national network of organizations working to address issues of nuclear weapons production and waste cleanup, founded in 1987 as the Military Production Network
- Global Zero—founded in 2008
- T.M.C. Asser Instituut—founded in 1965

== See also ==
- Arms deals
- Arms embargo
- Arms industry
- Arms trafficking
- Disarmament
- Export control
- Guns versus butter model
- List of chemical arms control agreements
- List of weapons of mass destruction treaties
- Offset agreement
- Peace and conflict studies
- Private military company
- Permanent war economy
- Small Arms and Light Weapons (SALW)
- United Nations Office for Disarmament Affairs
