= Disarmament =

Act of reducing, limiting, or abolishing weapons, usually on a national scale

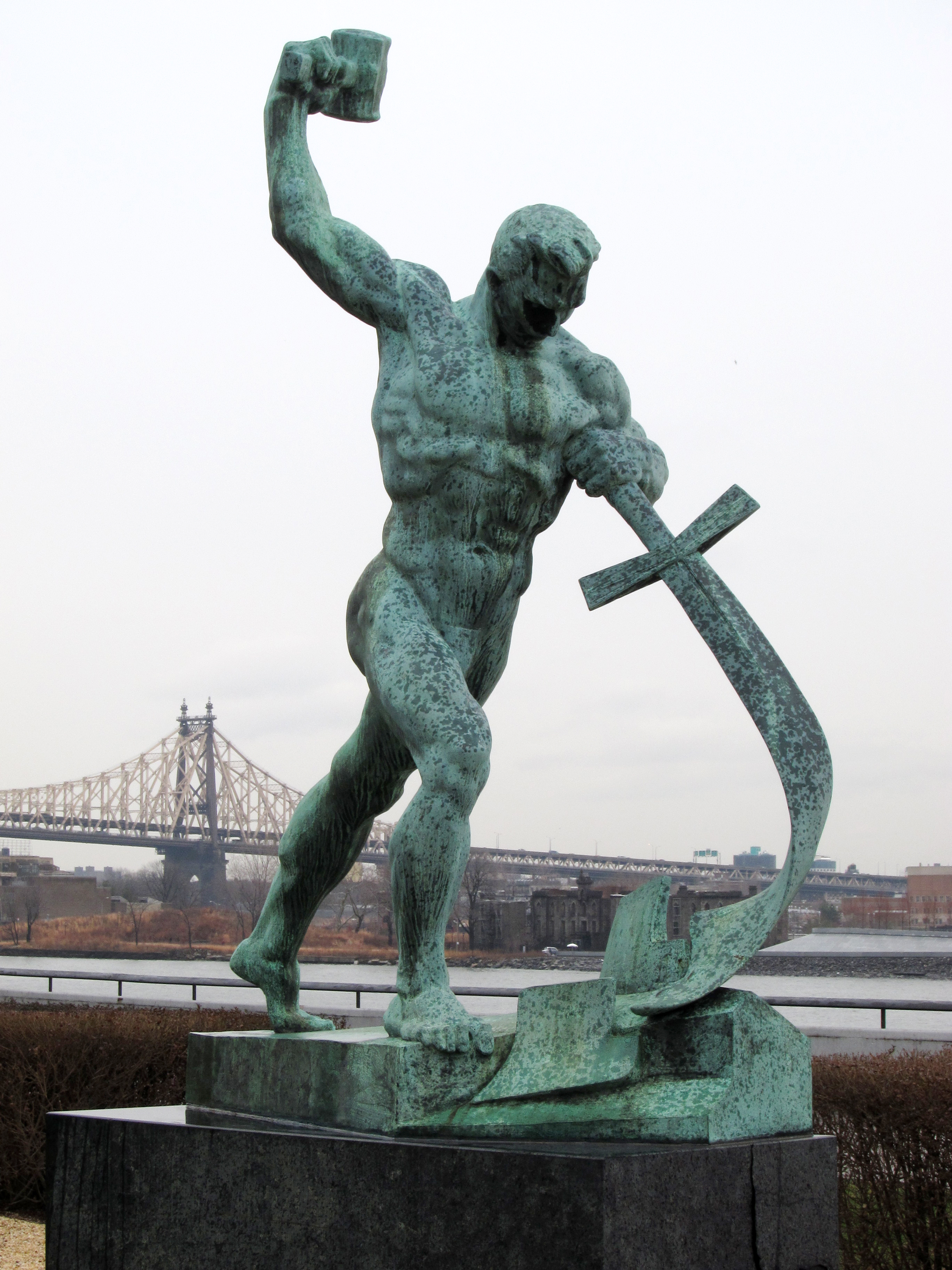
Let Us Beat Swords into Plowshares in the United Nations garden (1957)

Disarmament is the act of reducing, limiting, or abolishing weapons. Disarmament generally refers to a country's military or a specific type of weaponry. Disarmament is often taken to mean total elimination of weapons of mass destruction, such as nuclear arms. General and Complete Disarmament was defined by the United Nations General Assembly as the elimination of all weapons of mass destruction, coupled with the “balanced reduction of armed forces and conventional armaments, based on the principle of undiminished security of the parties with a view to promoting or enhancing stability at a lower military level, taking into account the need of all States to protect their security.”

== History ==
At the Hague Peace Conferences in 1899 and 1907 government delegations debated about disarmament and the creation of an international court with binding powers. The court was considered necessary because it was understood that nation-states could not disarm into a vacuum. After World War I revulsion at the futility and tremendous cost of the war was widespread. A commonly held belief was that the cause of the war had been the escalating buildup of armaments in the previous half century among the great powers (see Anglo-German naval arms race). Although the Treaty of Versailles effectively disarmed Germany, a clause was inserted that called on all the great powers to likewise progressively disarm over a period of time. The newly formed League of Nations made this an explicit goal in the covenant of the league, which committed its signatories to reduce armaments 'to the lowest point consistent with national safety and the enforcement by common action of international obligations'.

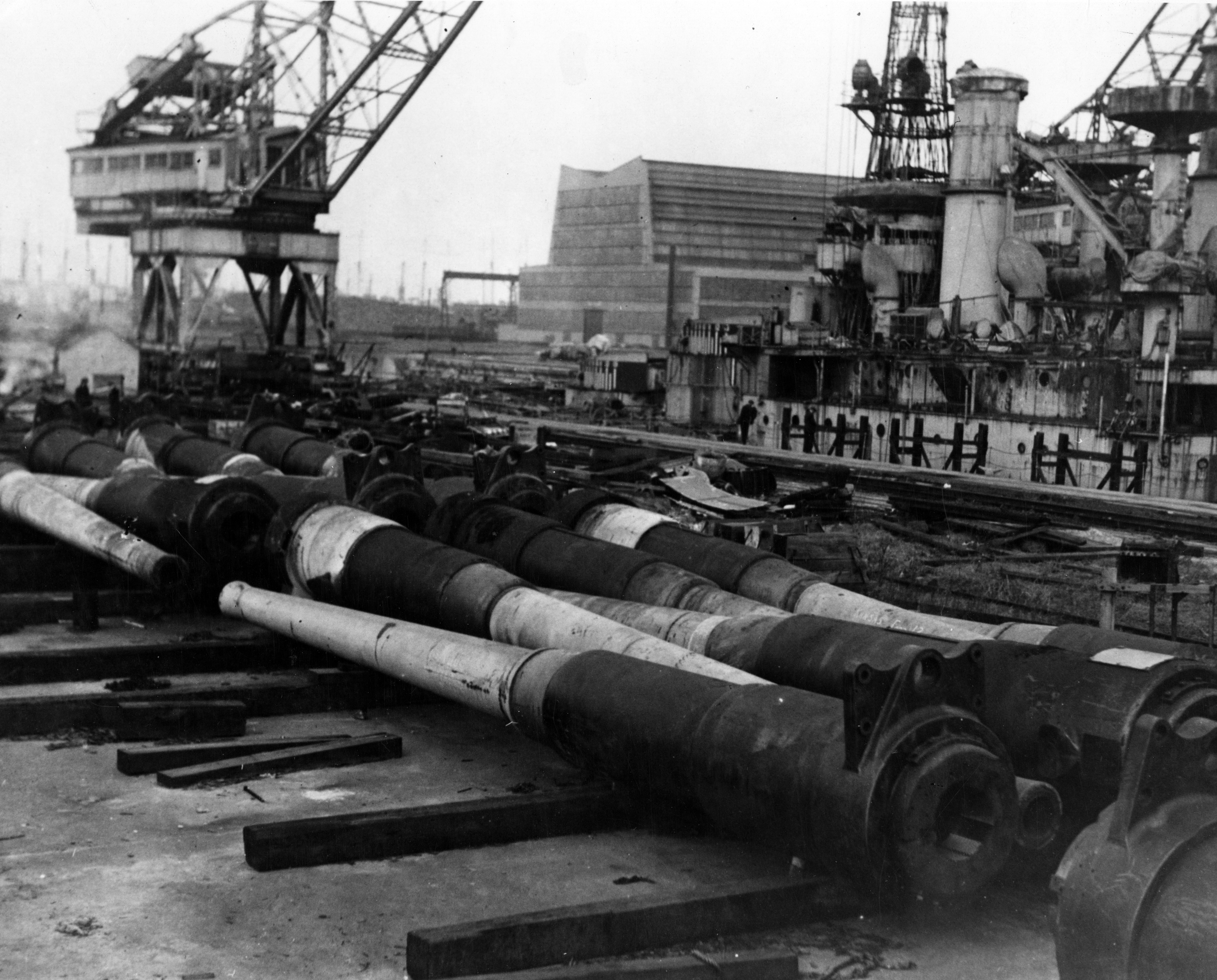
Battleships being dismantled for scrap in Philadelphia Navy Yard, after the Washington Naval Treaty imposed limits on capital ships

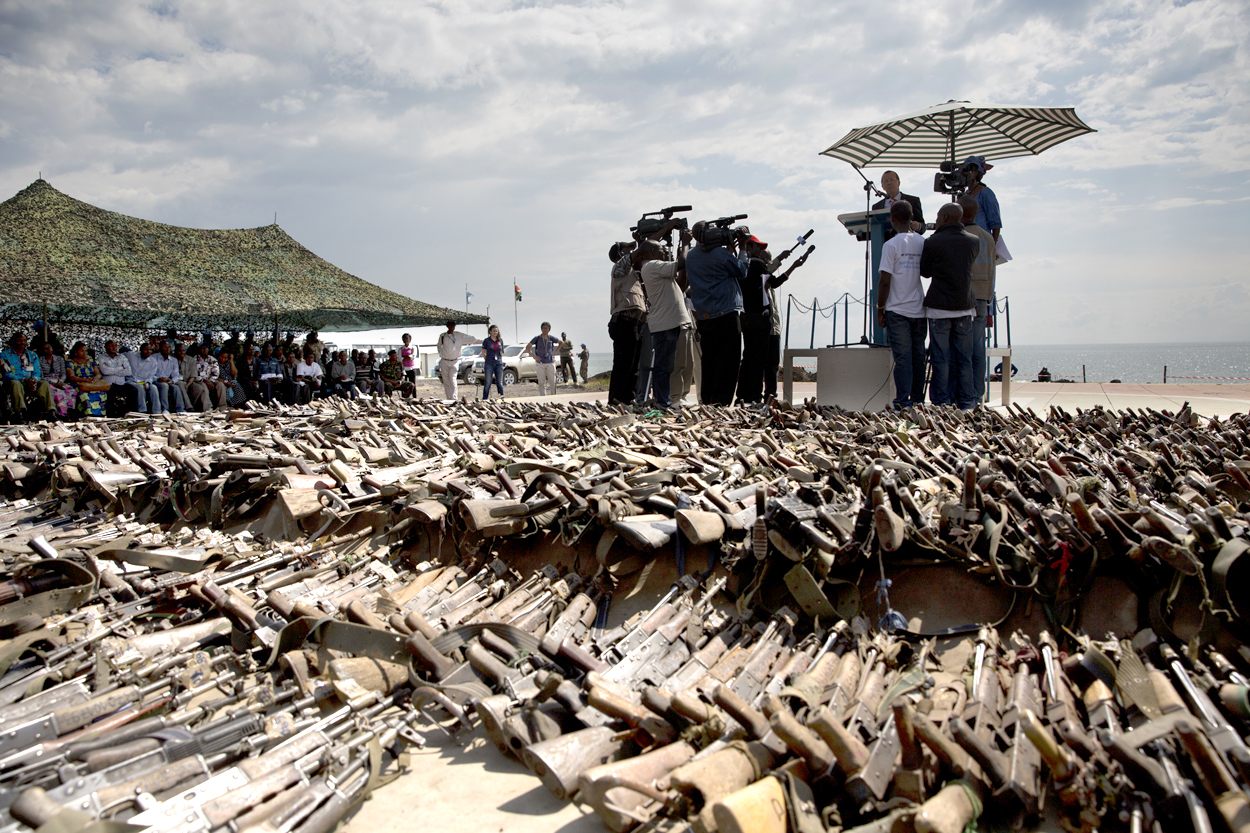
Martin Kobler addresses attendees at a disarmament ceremony in Goma, Democratic Republic of Congo.

One of the earliest successful achievements in disarmament was obtained with the Washington Naval Treaty. Signed by the governments of Great Britain, the United States, Japan, France, and Italy, it prevented the continued construction of capital ships and limited ships of other classification to under 10,000 tons displacement. The size of the three country's navies (the Royal Navy, United States Navy and Imperial Japanese Navy) was set at the ratio 5-5-3.

In 1921, the Temporary Mixed Commission on Armaments was set up by the League of Nations to explore possibilities for disarmament. It was made up not of government representatives but of famous individuals who rarely agreed. Proposals ranged from abolishing chemical warfare and strategic bombing to the limitation of more conventional weapons, such as tanks. A draft treaty was assembled in 1923 that made aggressive war illegal and bound the member states to defend victims of aggression by force. Since the onus of responsibility would, in practice, be on the great powers of the League, it was opposed by the First MacDonald ministry of the British government, whose opposition to the treaty, made official on 5 July 1924, "effectively buried the proposal for good."

Another commission in 1926, set up to explore the possibilities for the reduction of army size, met similar difficulties. However, acting outside the League. French Foreign Minister Aristide Briand and US Secretary of State Frank Kellogg drafted a treaty known as the Kellogg–Briand Pact, which denounced war of aggression. There were 65 signatories to the pact, but it set out no guidelines for action in the event of a war. It was in 1946 used to convict and execute Nazi leaders of war crimes.

A final attempt was made at the Geneva Disarmament Conference from 1932 to 1937, chaired by former British Foreign Secretary Arthur Henderson. Germany demanded the revision of the Versailles Treaty and the granting of military parity with the other powers, while France was determined to keep Germany demilitarised for its own security. Meanwhile, the British and Americans were not willing to offer France security commitments in exchange for conciliation with Germany. The talks broke down in 1933, when Adolf Hitler withdrew Germany from the conference.

== Concept ==
In his definition of "disarmament", David Carlton writes in the Oxford University Press political dictionary, "But confidence in such measures of arms control, especially when unaccompanied by extensive means of verification, has not been strengthened by the revelation that the Soviet Union in its last years successfully concealed consistent and systematic cheating on its obligations under the Biological Weapons Convention." He also notes, "Now a freeze or a mutually agreed increase is not strictly speaking disarmament at all. And such measures may not even be intended to be a first step towards any kind of reduction or abolition. For the aim may simply be to promote stability in force structures. Hence a new term to cover such cases has become fashionable since the 1960s, namely, arms control."

Decreasing defensive capabilities can increase the security dilemma. The Budapest Memorandum is an example where disarmament without effective security assurances contributed to escalation in the form of Russo-Ukrainian war.

=== Nuclear disarmament ===
United States and USSR/Russian nuclear weapons stockpiles, 1945–2006. These numbers include warheads not actively deployed, including those on reserve status or scheduled for dismantlement. Stockpile totals do not necessarily reflect nuclear capabilities since they ignore size, range, type, and delivery mode.

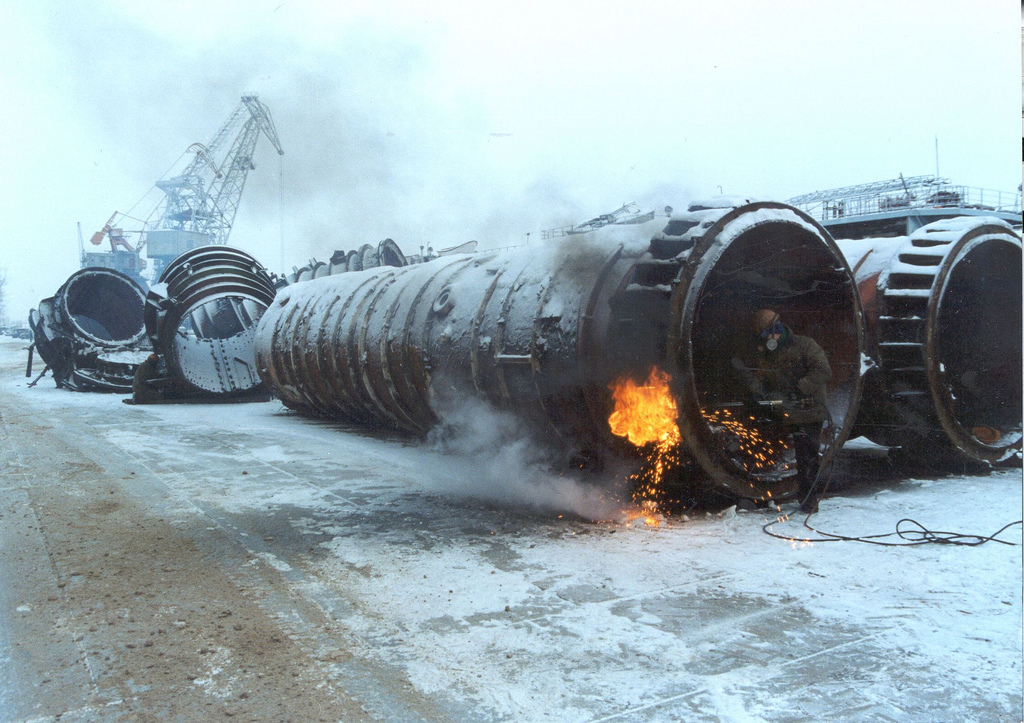
Workers cut launch tubes for nuclear missiles as part of the Cooperative Threat Reduction program.

Nuclear disarmament refers to both the act of reducing or eliminating nuclear weapons and to the end state of a nuclear-free world, in which nuclear weapons are completely eliminated.

In the United Kingdom, the Campaign for Nuclear Disarmament (CND) held an inaugural public meeting at Central Hall, Westminster, on 17 February 1958, attended by five thousand people. After the meeting a few hundred left to demonstrate at Downing Street.

CND's declared policies were the unconditional renunciation of the use, production of or dependence upon nuclear weapons by Britain and the bringing about of a general disarmament convention. The first Aldermaston March was organised by the CND and took place at Easter 1958, when several thousand people marched for four days from Trafalgar Square, London, to the Atomic Weapons Research Establishment close to Aldermaston in Berkshire, England, to demonstrate their opposition to nuclear weapons. The Aldermaston marches continued into the late 1960s when tens of thousands of people took part in the four-day marches.

In 1961, US President John F. Kennedy gave a speech before the UN General Assembly where he announced the US "intention to challenge the Soviet Union, not to an arms race, but to a peace race – to advance together step by step, stage by stage, until general and complete disarmament has been achieved." He went on to call for a global general and complete disarmament, offering a rough outline for how this could be accomplished:

The program to be presented to this assembly – for general and complete disarmament under effective international control – moves to bridge the gap between those who insist on a gradual approach and those who talk only of the final and total achievement. It would create machinery to keep the peace as it destroys the machinery of war. It would proceed through balanced and safeguarded stages designed to give no state a military advantage over another. It would place the final responsibility for verification and control where it belongs, not with the big powers alone, not with one's adversary or one's self, but in an international organization within the framework of the United Nations. It would assure that indispensable condition of disarmament – true inspection – and apply it in stages proportionate to the stage of disarmament. It would cover delivery systems as well as weapons. It would ultimately halt their production as well as their testing, their transfer as well as their possession. It would achieve under the eyes of an international disarmament organization, a steady reduction in force, both nuclear and conventional, until it has abolished all armies and all weapons except those needed for internal order and a new United Nations Peace Force. And it starts that process now, today, even as the talks begin. In short, general and complete disarmament must no longer be a slogan, used to resist the first steps. It is no longer to be a goal without means of achieving it, without means of verifying its progress, without means of keeping the peace. It is now a realistic plan, and a test – a test of those only willing to talk and a test of those willing to act.

Major nuclear disarmament groups include Campaign for Nuclear Disarmament, Greenpeace and International Physicians for the Prevention of Nuclear War. There have been many large anti-nuclear demonstrations and protests. On June 12, 1982, one million people demonstrated in New York City's Central Park against nuclear weapons and for an end to the Cold War arms race. It was the largest anti-nuclear protest and the largest political demonstration in American history. Following decades of campaigning the New Zealand government banned nuclear-armed and powered ships from entering the country's territorial waters in 1984 with the ban later extended to cover land and airspace.

=== Police disarmament ===
The police disarmament movement is a political movement that advocates disarming police officers and law enforcement officers who regularly carry weaponry, such as those in the United States. Proposed police disarmament methods range from simply emphasizing de-escalation and less-lethal alternatives over lethal force; to limiting police access to firearms to specific units (such as police tactical units or authorised firearms officers) or to when authorized or necessary; to defunding or replacing police with other systems of public safety. The concept dates back to the 1900s and has historically been championed by anarchists and libertarians alike.

== Disarmament conferences and treaties ==
- 1520: Field of the Cloth of Gold Summit
- 1675: Strasbourg Agreement (1675)
- 1899: Hague Peace Conference
- 1919: Treaty of Versailles
- 1927: Kellogg–Briand Pact
- 1932–1934: World Disarmament Conference
- 1960: Ten Nation Disarmament Committee
- 1962–1968: Eighteen Nation Disarmament Committee
- 1969–1978: Conference of the Committee on Disarmament
- 1979–present: Conference on Disarmament (CD)

=== Naval ===
- 1908–1909: London Naval Conference
- 1921–1922: Washington Naval Conference
- 1927: Geneva Naval Conference
- 1930: London Naval Conference leading to the London Naval Treaty
- 1935: London Naval Conference leading to the Second London Naval Treaty

=== Weapons of Mass Destruction ===
- 1970: Non-Proliferation Treaty (NPT)
- 1975: Biological Weapons Convention (BWC)
- 1997: Chemical Weapons Convention (CWC)

=== Space ===
- 1967: Outer Space Treaty

== See also ==
- 1923 Draft Treaty of Mutual Assistance
- Arms control
- Arms embargo
- Bargaining model of war
- Chemical weapons
- Defensive realism
- Guns versus butter model
- List of chemical arms control agreements
- Military Keynesianism
- Nuclear disarmament
  - Decommissioning of Russian nuclear-powered vessels
- Peace dividend
- United Nations Office for Disarmament Affairs
