= Banned substance (disambiguation) =

Banned substance may refer to:

- A performance-enhancing substance that is banned by a sports league; see Doping in sport
- Illegal drug trade
- Red List building materials
- List of chemical arms control agreements
- Toxic Substances Control Act of 1976
