= 1990 Chemical Weapons Accord =

US–Soviet chemical weapons destruction treaty

U.S.-Soviet Chemical Weapons Accord
Agreement on Destruction and Non-production of Chemical Weapons and on Measures to Facilitate the Multilateral Convention on Banning Chemical Weapons
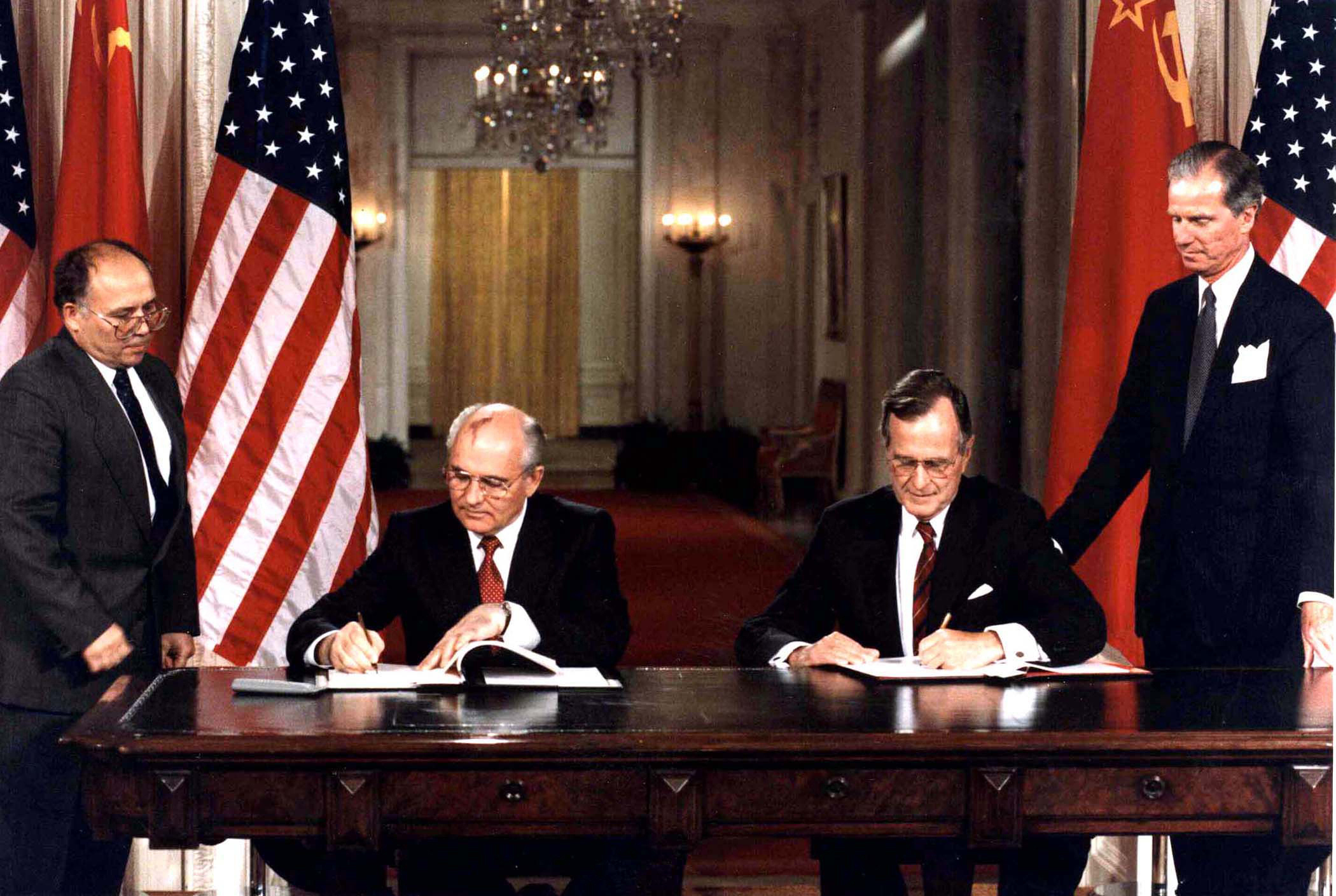
- George H.W. Bush and Mikhail Gorbachev signing the bilateral accord to cease production and eliminate stockpiles of Chemical weapons
- Signed: June 1, 1990
- Location: East Room of the White House, Washington D.C.

On June 1, 1990, Presidents George H. W. Bush and Mikhail Gorbachev signed the bilateral U.S.–Soviet Chemical Weapons Accord; officially known as the "Agreement on Destruction and Non-production of Chemical Weapons and on Measures to Facilitate the Multilateral Convention on Banning Chemical Weapons". This pact was signed during a summit meeting in Washington D.C.

== Criteria ==
The bilateral agreement required the destruction to begin before 1993 and to reduce Chemical weapon (CW) stockpiles to no more than 5,000 agent tons each by December 31, 2002. It also required both sides to halt CW production upon entry into force of the accord. Additionally on-site inspections were authorized to confirm that destruction has taken place and data exchanges on stockpile levels would occur to facilitate monitoring. The Accord also included a mutual pledge to support a global ban on CW.

== See also ==
- Chemical warfare
- Chemical Weapons Convention
- List of chemical arms control agreements
- Lethal Unitary Chemical Agents and Munitions
- List of Soviet Union–United States summits
- Novichok agent
