= List of chemical arms control agreements =

Chemical arms control is the attempt to limit the use or possession of chemical weapons through arms control agreements. These agreements are often motivated by the common belief "that these weapons ...are abominable", and by a general agreement that chemical weapons do "not accord with the feelings and principles of civilized warfare."

The first chemical arms control agreement was the Strasbourg Agreement of 1675 between France and the Holy Roman Empire. This bilateral pact prohibited the use of poisoned bullets in any war between the two states. In the several centuries after that agreement, as chemistry advanced, states developed more sophisticated chemical weapons, and the primary concern in arms control shifted from poison bullets to poison gases. Thus, in the Hague Convention of 1899, a large group of states agreed "to abstain from the use of projectiles the sole objective of which is the diffusion of asphyxiating or deleterious gases". The 1907 Hague Convention and other early attempts at chemical arms control were also significant in restricting the use of chemical weapons in warfare.

World War I broke out in Europe less than 20 years after the signing of the Hague Conventions. During that conflict, chemical weapons were used extensively by all sides in what still remains the largest case of chemical warfare. The use of chemical weapons in warfare was a war crime as such use was in direct violation of the 1899 Hague Declaration Concerning Asphyxiating Gases and the 1907 Hague Convention on Land Warfare, which prohibited the use of "poison or poisoned weapons" in warfare. After World War I, arms control agreements in general, and chemical arms control agreements in particular, gained renewed support. After seeing the gas attacks of the war, the general public overwhelmingly supported provisions that strongly regulated chemical weapons. In one survey of Americans, 367,000 favored banning chemical warfare while 19 supported its continuation in the future. This public opinion stimulated increased efforts for a ban on chemical weapons. These efforts led to several agreements in the years before World War II, including the Geneva Protocol.

World War II was seen as a significant success for chemical arms control as none of the belligerents made significant use of chemical weapons. In the immediate aftermath of the war, arms control efforts focused primarily on nuclear weapons given their immense destructive power, and chemical disarmament was not a priority. Nonetheless, chemical warfare began to expand again with gas attacks during the Yemeni Civil War, and allegations of use during the Korean War. Along with the substantial use of chemical weapons in the Iran–Iraq War, these incidents led to a renewed interest in chemical disarmament and increased the push towards disarmament, finally culminating in the 1993 Chemical Weapons Convention, a full-scale ban on the use, production and stockpiling of weapons, which took force in 1997.

== List of agreements ==
Agreement	Year	Parties	Nature of prohibition	Ref
Strasbourg Agreement	1675	France; Holy Roman Empire	Prohibited the use of poison bullets in wars between the two states	
Brussels Declaration	1874	Never ratified	Proposed a ban on "employment of poison or poisoned weapons". It was never adopted, but helped lead to the Hague Conventions.	
Declaration of the Hague Convention of 1899	1899	31 states (Note: For a complete list see "Declaration concerning Asphyxiating Gases" (PDF). Archived from the original (PDF) on 2014-12-14.)	Banned "projectiles the sole objective of which is the diffusion of asphyxiating or deleterious gases."	
Hague Convention of 1907	1907	35 states (Note: For a complete list see "Convention (IV) respecting the Laws and Customs of War on Land" (PDF). Archived from the original (PDF) on 2012-02-22.)	Banned the use of "poisons or poisonous weapons"	
Treaty of Versailles	1919	Germany; Allies of World War I	Forbade the production or importation of poison gases by Germany	
Washington Arms Conference	1922	Never ratified (Note: The provisions on chemical warfare were inserted in an agreement of submarines, which did not go into force due to French opposition.)	Proposed a ban on all forms of chemical warfare	
Geneva Protocol	1925	137 states (Note: For a complete list see "List of States Parties To The Protocol" (PDF). Archived from the original (PDF) on 2012-02-22.)	Banned the use of "asphyxiating, poisonous or other Gases, and bacteriological methods of warfare." This is only applicable against nationals of an enemy state signatory to the Protocol in international armed conflicts.	
World Disarmament Conference	1933	Never ratified (Note: The World Disarmament Conference ceased activities in 1936, so the proposed agreement on chemical weapons was never adopted.)	Proposed an expansion of the Geneva Protocol to provide a precise definition of chemical warfare and prohibit chemical warfare against non-signatory states.	
Biological Weapons Convention	1972	183 states (list)	Banned all forms of biological warfare. While not a chemical arms control treaty, it was the result of discussions on both chemical and biological weapons and an important stepping stone towards chemical weapons agreements.	
Australia Group	1985	41 states	A group of countries formed to control the export of materials that could be used in chemical and biological warfare. Prohibited shipments of chemical weapons and regulated trade in precursors.	
Geneva Summit	1985	U.S. and Soviet Union	A joint statement issued by U.S. President Ronald Reagan and Soviet General Secretary Mikhail Gorbachev called for "an accelerated timetable to conclude an effective and verifiable [chemical weapons (CW)] ban" and also pledged "to begin discussions on preventing the proliferation of [CW]."	
Declaration of the Conference on Chemical Weapons Use	1989	149 states	A gathering of states that reaffirmed the Geneva Protocol. All states agreed to "solemnly affirm their commitments not to use chemical weapons and condemn such use."	
1990 Chemical Weapons Accord	1990	U.S. and Soviet Union	A bilateral agreement requiring each nation to reduce their stockpiles of chemical weapons (CW) to no more than 5,000 agent tons by December 31, 2002. The agreement stipulated that destruction of the excess tonnage would begin before 1993 and it required each side cease production of CW upon the accord's entry into force.	
India–Pakistan Chemical Weapons Agreement	1992	India and Pakistan	A bilateral agreement provides for the complete prohibition of chemical weapons in India and Pakistan, and requires both countries to make a commitment to not develop, possess or use chemical weapons.	
Chemical Weapons Convention	1993	188 states (list)	Prohibited the "development, production, acquisition, retention, stockpiling, transfer and use of all chemical weapons." Required states to declare and destroy their chemical arsenals, and provided for the control of chemical weapons precursors.	
United Nations Security Council Resolution 1540	2004	All UN Member States	The resolution establishes the obligations under Chapter VII of the United Nations Charter for all Member States to develop and enforce appropriate legal and regulatory measures against the proliferation of chemical, biological, radiological, and nuclear weapons and their means of delivery, in particular, to non-state actors.	

== See also ==
- List of weapons of mass destruction treaties
- Biological Weapons Convention (1975)
