= Eighteen Nation Committee on Disarmament =

United Nations-sponsored committee

The Eighteen Nation Committee on Disarmament (ENDC) was sponsored by the United Nations in 1961. The ENDC considered disarmament, confidence-building measures and nuclear test controls. Between 1965 and 1968, the ENDC negotiated the Treaty on the Non-Proliferation of Nuclear Weapons.

== History ==
The United Nations (UN) General Assembly accepted the decision of the major powers to create the ENDC through resolution 1722 (XVI) on December 21, 1961. The ENDC began work on March 14, 1962, in Geneva, Switzerland, and met regularly until August 26, 1969. On that date the ENDC was reconstituted as the Conference of the Committee on Disarmament (CCD). The August 26 meeting of the ENDC was its 431st since its inception. Soon after the ENDC began work the Soviet Union submitted a draft treaty for consideration. The USSR Draft Treaty on General and Complete Disarmament under Strict International Control was submitted to the ENDC on March 15, 1962. The Soviet draft treaty was an 18-point plan for disarmament in three stages which included nuclear disarmament and the creation of a UN special disarmament organization. The United States quickly countered with its own proposals on April 18, 1962.

== Members ==
The ENDC included the original members of the Ten Nation Committee on Disarmament (TNCD) as well as eight additional member nations. The ENDC actually only included the participation of seventeen nations, as France did not participate in an official capacity. However, they were involved in an unofficial role in consultations with the other Western representatives.

The original members of TNCD were: (Western Bloc) – Canada, France, Italy, United Kingdom, United States. (Eastern Bloc) – Bulgaria, Czechoslovakia, Poland, Romania, Soviet Union.

The nations added to ENDC were: Brazil, Burma, Ethiopia, India, Mexico, Nigeria, Sweden, United Arab Republic (UAR).

== Results and legacy ==
The ENDC (1962–1969) was one of several predecessors to the current UN disarmament organization, the Conference on Disarmament (CD). The ENDC followed the short-lived Ten Nation Committee on Disarmament (1960), and was succeeded by the CCD (1969–1978) until the CD was formed in 1979.

After the events of the Cuban Missile Crisis in 1962 leaders in both Washington, D.C., and Moscow found that communicating with each other was plagued with certain delay. In the aftermath of the crisis the ENDC presented a working paper titled "Measures to Reduce the Risk of War Through Accident, Miscalculation, or Failure of Communication". In the paper, the United States proposed a direct link of communication between Washington and Moscow. Though the Soviets had previously rejected such a link outside the framework of a larger disarmament agreement in April 1963 both sides announced a willingness to commit to such an agreement. The agreement, usually known as the "Hot Line Agreement" was signed and entered into force on June 20, 1963. Although the ENDC ratified the Hot Line Agreement the negotiations that actually led to its implementation occurred outside the confines of the committee.
