= John D. Steinbruner =

American academic

John David Steinbruner (1941–2015) was an international security scholar. Steinbruner was a political science professor at both the Massachusetts Institute of Technology and Yale University, and he also taught public policy at Harvard Kennedy School at Harvard University. He later joined the Brookings Institution, where he led the foreign policy studies program from 1978 to 1996. In his book The Cybernetic Theory of Decision he explores how policymakers navigate the significant uncertainty and core value conflicts in bureaucratic politics.
