= Conference of the Committee on Disarmament =

United Nations committee

The Conference of the Committee on Disarmament was a United Nations disarmament committee authorized by a General Assembly resolution. It began work in 1969 as the successor to the Eighteen Nation Committee on Disarmament.

== History ==
The Conference of the Committee on Disarmament (CCD) succeeded the Eighteen Nation Committee on Disarmament (ENDC) as the U.N.'s disarmament committee in 1969. In addition to changing the committee's name, General Assembly Resolution 2602(XXIV) expanded the membership from the ENDC's 18 to the new CCD's 26. The CCD was enlarged again by the General Assembly from 26 to 31 nations in 1975. Throughout the process of UN disarmament negotiations, including through its various name changes, the CCD received instructions from and reported to the UN General Assembly. The CCD, like its two predecessors, was chaired by the United States and Soviet Union.

== Member nations ==
The CCD included the original members of the Ten Nation Committee on Disarmament (TNCD) as well as the eight additional member nations of the ENCD. The ENCD actually only included the participation of seventeen nations, as France did not participate in an official capacity. However, they were involved in an unofficial role in consultations with the other Western representatives. While France was an original member of the ENCD, it again chose not to participate in the negotiations or sessions of the CCD.

Original members of TNCD: (Western Bloc) - Canada, France, Great Britain, Italy, United States. (Eastern Bloc) - Bulgaria, Czechoslovakia, Poland, Romania, Soviet Union.

Nations added to ENCD: Brazil, Burma, Ethiopia, India, Mexico, Nigeria, Sweden, United Arab Republic (UAR).

Nations added to CCD (1969): Argentina, Morocco, Japan, Hungary, Mongolia, Netherlands, Pakistan, Yugoslavia.

Nations added to the CCD (1975): Federal Republic of Germany (West Germany), German Democratic Republic, Peru, Iran, Zaire.

== Results and legacy ==
The CCD (1969–1979) was one of several predecessors to the current UN disarmament organization, the Conference on Disarmament (CD). The ENCD (1962–69) followed the short-lived Ten Nation Committee on Disarmament (1960), and was succeeded by the CCD (1969–78) until the CD was formed in 1979.

Discussions in the CCD played a role in the interpretation of the Geneva Protocol. The United States had argued that the Protocol did not apply to non-toxic gases and herbicides, prompting the UN Secretary-General to request a "clear affirmation" that the Protocol prohibited the use of all chemical and biological agents. Most member nations of the CCD agreed that it did and discussions ultimately led to a UN General Assembly resolution affirming that the use of all chemical and biological agents in war was against international law. The resolution eventually passed 80–3; the U.S. voted "no" and 36 nations abstained.
