= Geneva Protocol =

Chemical and biological warfare treaty

Protocol for the Prohibition of the Use in War of Asphyxiating, Poisonous or other Gases, and of Bacteriological Methods of Warfare
- Drafted: 17 June 1925
- Signed: 17 June 1925
- Location: Geneva
- Effective: 8 February 1928
- Condition: Ratification by 65 states
- Signatories: 38
- Parties: 146
- Depositary: Government of France

Full text
- Geneva Protocol to Hague Convention at Wikisource

The Protocol for the Prohibition of the Use in War of Asphyxiating, Poisonous or other Gases, and of Bacteriological Methods of Warfare, usually called the Geneva Protocol, is a treaty prohibiting the use of chemical and biological weapons in international armed conflicts. It was signed at Geneva on 17 June 1925 and entered into force on 8 February 1928. It was registered in League of Nations Treaty Series on 7 September 1929. The Geneva Protocol is a protocol to the Convention for the Supervision of the International Trade in Arms and Ammunition and in Implements of War signed on the same date, and followed the Hague Conventions of 1899 and 1907.

It prohibits the use of "asphyxiating, poisonous or other gases, and of all analogous liquids, materials or devices" and "bacteriological methods of warfare". This is now understood to be a general prohibition on chemical weapons and biological weapons between state parties, but has nothing to say about production, storage or transfer. Later treaties did cover these aspects – the 1972 Biological Weapons Convention (BWC) and the 1993 Chemical Weapons Convention (CWC).

A number of countries submitted reservations when becoming parties to the Geneva Protocol, declaring that they only regarded the non-use obligations as applying to other parties and that these obligations would cease to apply if the prohibited weapons were used against them.

== Negotiation history ==
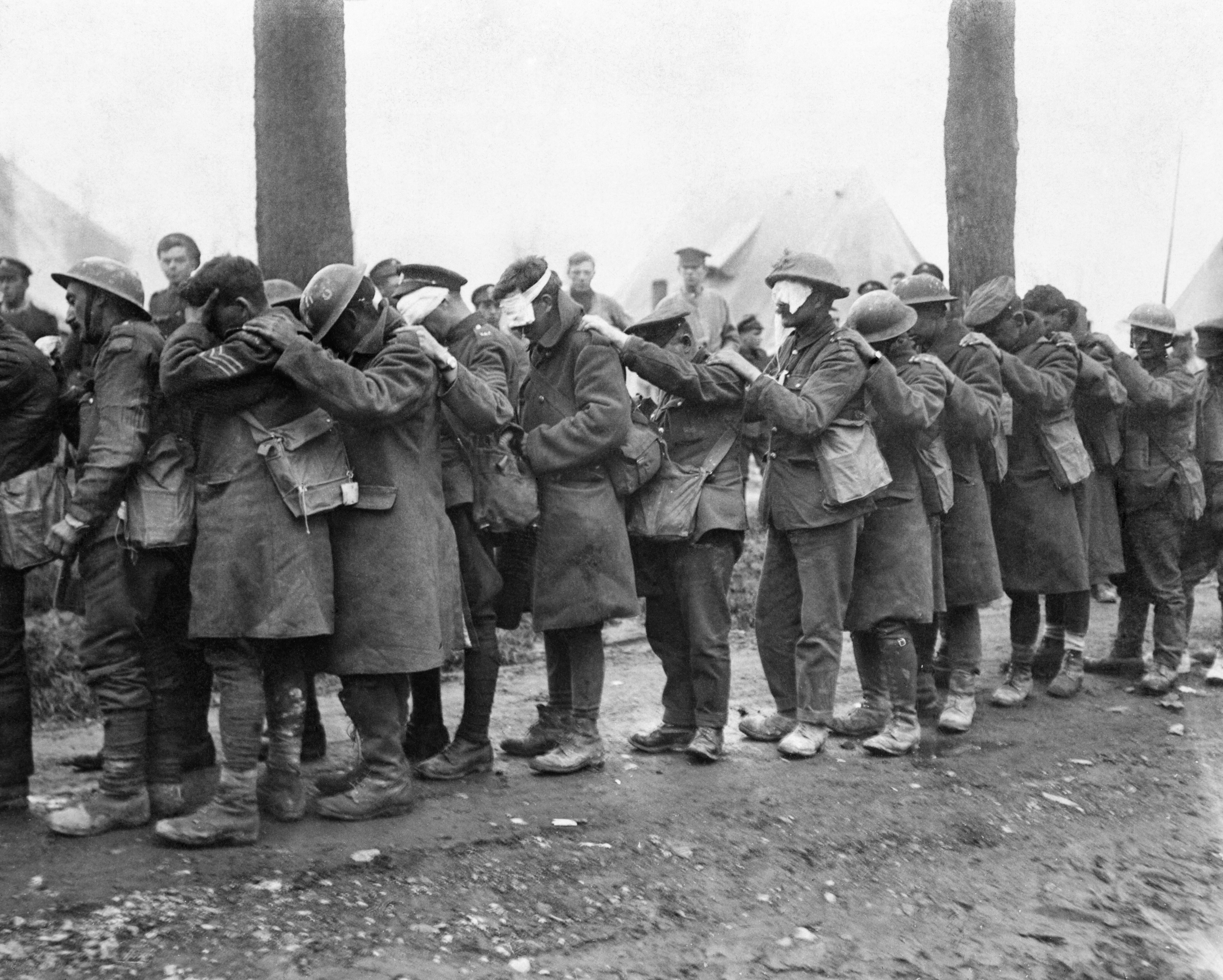
British troops blinded by poison gas during the Battle of Estaires, 1918

In the Hague Conventions of 1899 and 1907, the use of dangerous chemical agents was outlawed. In spite of this, the First World War saw large-scale chemical warfare. France used tear gas in 1914, but the first large-scale successful deployment of chemical weapons was by the German Empire in Ypres, Belgium, in 1915, when chlorine gas was released as part of a German attack at the Battle of Gravenstafel. Following this, a chemical arms race began, with the United Kingdom, Russia, Austria-Hungary, the United States, and Italy joining France and Germany in the use of chemical weapons.

This resulted in the development of a range of horrific chemicals affecting lungs, skin, or eyes. Some were intended to be lethal on the battlefield, like hydrogen cyanide, and efficient methods of deploying agents were invented. At least 124,000 tons were produced during the war. In 1918, about one grenade out of three was filled with dangerous chemical agents. Around 500k-1.3 million casualties of the conflict were attributed to the use of gas, and the psychological effect on troops may have had a much greater effect. A few thousand civilians also became casualties as collateral damage or due to production accidents.

The Treaty of Versailles included some provisions that banned Germany from either manufacturing or importing chemical weapons. Similar treaties banned the First Austrian Republic, the Kingdom of Bulgaria, and the Kingdom of Hungary from chemical weapons, all belonging to the losing side, the Central Powers. Russian bolsheviks and Britain continued the use of chemical weapons in the Russian Civil War and possibly in the Middle East in 1920.

Three years after World War I, the Allies wanted to reaffirm the Treaty of Versailles, and in 1922 the United States introduced the Treaty relating to the Use of Submarines and Noxious Gases in Warfare at the Washington Naval Conference. Four of the war victors, the United States, the United Kingdom, the Kingdom of Italy and the Empire of Japan, gave consent for ratification, but it failed to enter into force as the French Third Republic objected to the submarine provisions of the treaty.

At the 1925 Geneva Conference for the Supervision of the International Traffic in Arms the French suggested a protocol for non-use of poisonous gases. The Second Polish Republic suggested the addition of bacteriological weapons. It was signed on 17 June.

== Historical assessment ==
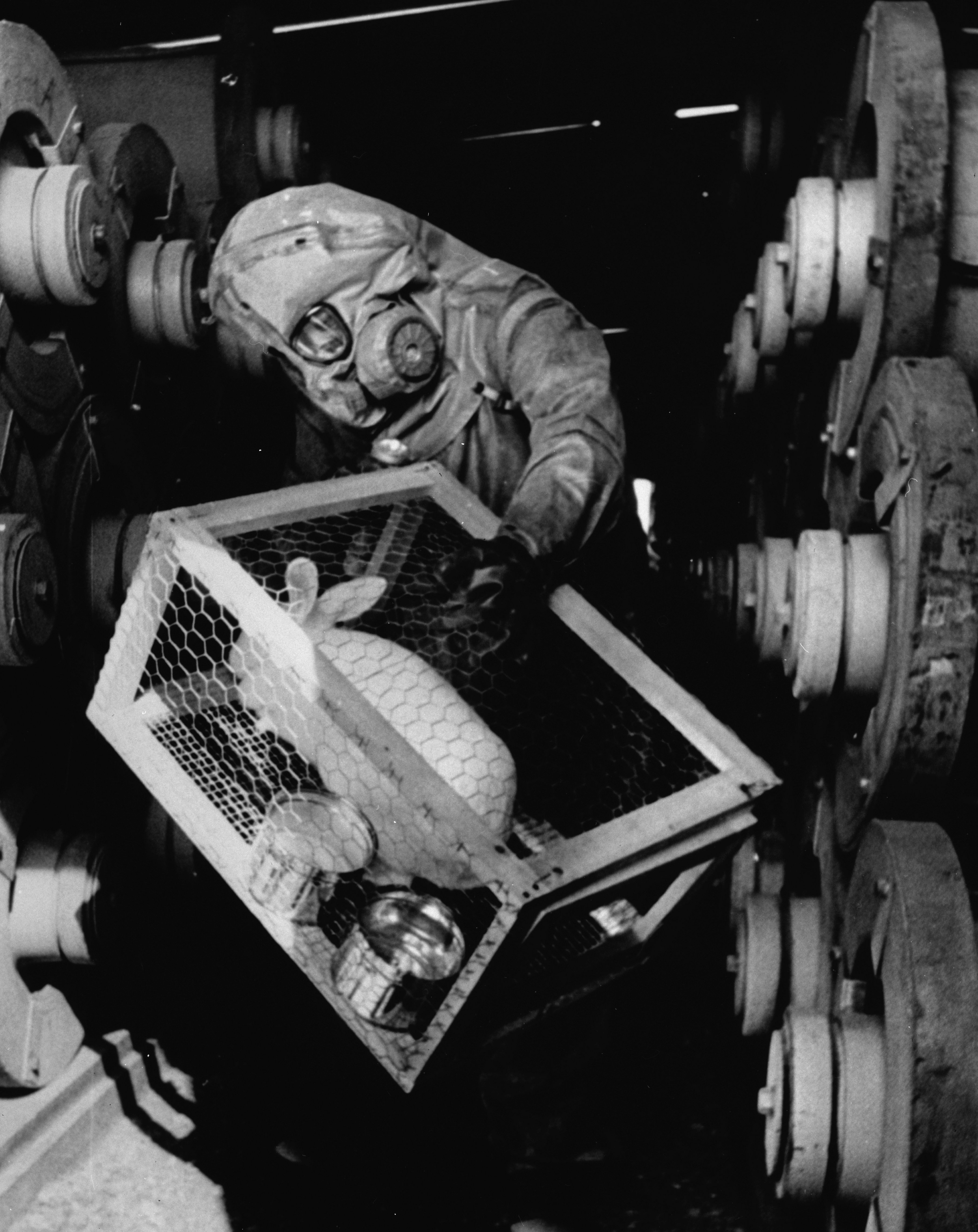
Rabbit used to check for leaks at a sarin production plant in 1970

Eric Croddy, assessing the Protocol in 2005, took the view that the historic record showed it had been largely ineffectual. Specifically it does not prohibit:

- use against not-ratifying parties
- retaliation using such weapons, so effectively making it a no-first-use agreement
- use within a state's own borders in a civil conflict
- research and development of such weapons, or stockpiling them

In light of these shortcomings, Jack Beard notes that "the Protocol (...) resulted in a legal framework that allowed states to conduct [biological weapons] research, develop new biological weapons, and ultimately engage in [biological weapons] arms races".

Additionally, the use of chemical weapons inside the nation's own territory against its citizens or subjects is not prohibited, such as those employed by Spain in the Rif War until 1927, Japan against Seediq indigenous rebels in Taiwan (then part of the Japanese colonial empire) in 1930 during the Musha Incident, Iraq against ethnic Kurdish civilians in the 1988 attack on Halabja during the Iran–Iraq War, and Syria or Syrian opposition forces during the Syrian civil war.

Despite the U.S. having been a proponent of the protocol, the U.S. military and American Chemical Society lobbied against it, causing the U.S. Senate not to ratify the protocol until 1975, the same year when the United States ratified the Biological Weapons Convention.

== Violations ==
Several state parties have deployed chemical weapons for combat in spite of the treaty. For example, chemical weapons were used by Spain during the Rif War, by Italy in the Second Italo-Ethiopian War, and by France during the Algerian War. In World War II, Germany employed chemical weapons in combat on several occasions along the Black Sea, notably in Sevastopol, where they used toxic smoke to force Soviet resistance fighters out of caverns below the city. They also used asphyxiating gas in the catacombs of Odesa in November 1941, following their capture of the city, and in late May 1942 during the Battle of the Kerch Peninsula in eastern Crimea, perpetrated by the Wehrmacht's Chemical Forces and organized by a special detail of SS troops with the help of a field engineer battalion. After the battle in mid-May 1942, the Germans gassed and killed almost 3,000 of the besieged and non-evacuated Red Army soldiers and Soviet civilians hiding in a series of caves and tunnels in the nearby Adzhimushkay quarry.

During the 1980-1988 Iran-Iraq War, Iraq is known to have employed a variety of chemical weapons against Iranian forces. Some 100,000 Iranian troops were casualties of Iraqi chemical weapons during the war.

== Subsequent interpretation of the protocol ==
In 1966, United Nations General Assembly resolution 2162B called for, without any dissent, all states to strictly observe the protocol. In 1969, United Nations General Assembly resolution 2603 (XXIV) declared that the prohibition on use of chemical and biological weapons in international armed conflicts, as embodied in the protocol (though restated in a more general form), were generally recognized rules of international law. Following this, there was discussion of whether the main elements of the protocol now form part of customary international law, and now this is widely accepted to be the case.

There have been differing interpretations over whether the protocol covers the use of harassing agents, such as adamsite and tear gas, and defoliants and herbicides, such as Agent Orange, in warfare. The 1977 Environmental Modification Convention prohibits the military use of environmental modification techniques having widespread, long-lasting or severe effects. Many states do not regard this as a complete ban on the use of herbicides in warfare, but it does require case-by-case consideration. The 1993 Chemical Weapons Convention effectively banned riot control agents from being used as a method of warfare, though still permitting it for riot control.

In recent times, the protocol had been interpreted to cover non-international armed conflicts as well international ones. In 1995, an appellate chamber in the International Criminal Tribunal for the former Yugoslavia stated that "there had undisputedly emerged a general consensus in the international community on the principle that the use of chemical weapons is also prohibited in internal armed conflicts." In 2005, the International Committee of the Red Cross concluded that customary international law includes a ban on the use of chemical weapons in internal as well as international conflicts.

However, such views drew general criticism from legal authors. They noted that much of the chemical arms control agreements stems from the context of international conflicts. Furthermore, the application of customary international law to banning chemical warfare in non-international conflicts fails to meet two requirements: state practice and opinio juris. Jillian Blake & Aqsa Mahmud cited the periodic use of chemical weapons in non-international conflicts since the end of WWI (as stated above) as well as the lack of existing international humanitarian law (such as the Geneva Conventions) and national legislation and manuals prohibiting using them in such conflicts. Anne Lorenzat stated the 2005 ICRC study was rooted in "'political and operational issues rather than legal ones".

== State parties ==
Parties to the Geneva Protocol Parties with no reservations Parties with withdrawn reservations Parties with implicit reservations Parties with unwithdrawn reservations limiting the applicability of provisions of the Protocol Non-parties

To become party to the Protocol, states must deposit an instrument with the government of France (the depositary power). Thirty-eight states originally signed the Protocol. France was the first signatory to ratify the Protocol on 10 May 1926. El Salvador, the final signatory to ratify the Protocol, did so on 26 February 2008. As of April 2021, 146 states have ratified, acceded to, or succeeded to the Protocol, most recently Colombia on 24 November 2015.

=== Reservations ===
A number of countries submitted reservations when becoming parties to the Geneva Protocol, declaring that they only regarded the non-use obligations as applying with respect to other parties to the Protocol and/or that these obligations would cease to apply with respect to any state, or its allies, which used the prohibited weapons. Several Arab states also declared that their ratification did not constitute recognition of, or diplomatic relations with, Israel, or that the provision of the Protocol were not binding with respect to Israel.

Generally, reservations not only modify treaty provisions for the reserving party, but also symmetrically modify the provisions for previously ratifying parties in dealing with the reserving party. Subsequently, numerous states have withdrawn their reservations, including the former Czechoslovakia in 1990 prior to its dissolution, or the Russian reservation on biological weapons that "preserved the right to retaliate in kind if attacked" with them, which was dissolved by President Yeltsin.

According to the Vienna Convention on Succession of States in respect of Treaties, states which succeed to a treaty after gaining independence from a state party "shall be considered as maintaining any reservation to that treaty which was applicable at the date of the succession of States in respect of the territory to which the succession of States relates unless, when making the notification of succession, it expresses a contrary intention or formulates a reservation which relates to the same subject matter as that reservation." While some states have explicitly either retained or renounced their reservations inherited on succession, states which have not clarified their position on their inherited reservations are listed as "implicit" reservations.

Party	Signed	Deposited	Reservations	Notes
Afghanistan		2 September 1986	—	
Albania		12 December 1989	—	
Algeria		14 January 1992	(Note: Binding only with regards to states which have ratified or acceded to the protocol.) (Note: Ceases to be binding in regards to any state, and its allies, which does not observe the prohibitions of the protocol.)	
Angola		30 October 1990		
Antigua and Barbuda		1 February 1989	Implicit on succession. (Note: According to the Vienna Convention on Succession of States in respect of Treaties, states which succeed to a treaty after gaining independence from a state party "shall be considered as maintaining any reservation to that treaty which was applicable at the date of the succession of States in respect of the territory to which the succession of States relates unless, when making the notification of succession, it expresses a contrary intention or formulates a reservation which relates to the same subject matter as that reservation." Any state which has not clarified their position on reservations inherited on succession are listed as "implicit" reservations.)	Succeeded from the United Kingdom.
Argentina		8 May 1969	—	
Armenia		13 March 2018	—	
Australia		22 January 1930	Withdrawn in 1986.	
Austria	17 June 1925	9 May 1928	—	
Bahrain		9 November 1988	(Note: Does not constitute recognition of, or establishing any relations with, Israel.)	
Bangladesh		20 May 1989		
Barbados		16 July 1976	Withdrew the reservations made by the United Kingdom on succession.	Succeeded from the United Kingdom.
Belgium	17 June 1925	4 December 1928	Withdrawn in 1997.	
Benin		4 December 1986	—	
Bhutan		12 June 1978	—	
Bolivia		14 January 1985	—	
Brazil	17 June 1925	28 August 1970	—	
Bulgaria	17 June 1925	7 March 1934	Withdrawn in 1991.	
Burkina Faso		1 March 1971	—	Ratified as the Republic of Upper Volta.
Cambodia		15 March 1983		The Protocol was ratified by the Coalition Government of Democratic Kampuchea in exile in 1983. 13 states (including the depositary France) objected to their ratification, and considered it legally invalid. In 1993, the Kingdom of Cambodia stated in a note verbale that it considered itself bound by the provisions of the Protocol.
Cameroon		21 April 1989	—	
Canada	17 June 1925	6 May 1930	Withdrawn in 1991 as regards bacteriological agents, and completely withdrawn in 1999.	
Cape Verde		20 May 1991	—	
Central African Republic		30 July 1970	—	
Chile	17 June 1925	2 July 1935	Withdrawn in 1991.	
China		7 August 1929	Made on succession.	Ratified as the Republic of China, from which the People's Republic of China succeeded on 13 July 1952.
Colombia		24 November 2015	—	
Costa Rica		17 June 2009	—	
Croatia		25 September 2006	—	
Cuba		24 May 1966	—	
Cyprus		29 November 1966	Implicit on succession.	Succeeded from the United Kingdom.
Czech Republic		19 September 1993	Withdrawn prior to succession.	Succeeded from Czechoslovakia, which ratified the protocol on 16 August 1938.
Denmark	17 June 1925	5 May 1930	—	
Dominican Republic		4 December 1970	—	
Ecuador		10 September 1970	—	
Egypt	17 June 1925	6 December 1928	—	
El Salvador	17 June 1925	12 January 2010	—	
Equatorial Guinea		16 May 1989	—	
Estonia	17 June 1925	28 August 1931	Withdrawn in 1999.	
Eswatini		10 July 1991		
Ethiopia	17 June 1925	7 October 1935	—	
Fiji		21 March 1973	Retained the United Kingdom's reservations on succession.	Succeeded from the United Kingdom.
Finland	17 June 1925	26 June 1929	—	
France	17 June 1925	10 May 1926	Withdrawn in 1996.	
Gambia		5 November 1966	Implicit on succession.	Succeeded from the United Kingdom.
Germany	17 June 1925	25 April 1929	—	
Ghana		2 May 1967	—	
Greece	17 June 1925	30 May 1931	—	
Grenada		3 January 1989	Implicit on succession.	Succeeded from the United Kingdom.
Guatemala		3 May 1983	—	
Guinea-Bissau		20 May 1989	—	
Holy See		12 October 1966	—	
Hungary	17 June 1925	11 October 1952	—	
Iceland		19 December 1966	—	
India	17 June 1925	9 April 1930		
Indonesia		14 January 1971	(Note: Ceases to be binding as to the use of chemical weapons in regards to any enemy state which does not observe the prohibitions of the protocol.) / Implicit on succession.	Succeeded from the Netherlands.
Iran		4 July 1929	—	
Iraq		18 August 1931		
Ireland		18 August 1930	Withdrawn in 1972.	
Israel		10 February 1969		
Italy	17 June 1925	3 April 1928	—	
Ivory Coast		27 July 1970	—	
Jamaica		28 July 1970	Implicit on succession.	Succeeded from the United Kingdom.
Japan	17 June 1925	21 May 1970	—	
Jordan		20 January 1977		
Kazakhstan		20 April 2020	—	
Kenya		17 June 1970	—	
Kuwait		15 December 1971	(Note: Ceases to be binding in the case of a violation.)	
Kyrgyzstan		29 June 2020	—	
Laos		16 January 1989	—	
Latvia	17 June 1925	3 June 1931	—	
Lebanon		15 April 1969	—	
Lesotho		10 March 1972	Implicit on succession.	Succeeded from the United Kingdom.
Liberia		2 April 1927	—	
Libya		21 December 1971		
Liechtenstein		16 May 1991	—	
Lithuania	17 June 1925	15 June 1933	—	
Luxembourg	17 June 1925	1 September 1936	—	
North Macedonia		20 August 2015	—	
Madagascar		2 August 1967	—	
Malawi		4 September 1970	—	
Malaysia		7 December 1970	—	
Maldives		27 December 1966	—	
Malta		9 October 1970	Implicit on succession.	Succeeded from the United Kingdom.
Mauritius		23 December 1970	Implicit on succession.	Succeeded from the United Kingdom.
Mexico		28 March 1932	—	
Moldova		14 January 2011	—	
Monaco		15 December 1966	—	
Mongolia		18 November 1968	Withdrawn in 1990.	
Morocco		7 October 1970	—	
Nepal		7 May 1969	—	
Netherlands	17 June 1925	31 October 1930	Withdrawn in 1995.	
New Zealand		22 January 1930	Withdrawn in 1989.	
Nicaragua	17 June 1925	5 October 1990	—	
Niger		5 April 1967	Implicit on succession.	Succeeded from France.
Nigeria		9 October 1968		
North Korea		22 December 1988		
Norway	17 June 1925	27 July 1932	—	
Pakistan		15 April 1960	Implicit on succession.	Succeeded from India.
Palestine		19 January 2018	—	
Panama		26 November 1970	—	
Papua New Guinea		2 September 1980	Retained Australia's reservations on succession.	Succeeded from Australia.
Paraguay		22 October 1933	—	
Peru		5 June 1985	—	
Philippines		29 May 1973	—	
Poland	17 June 1925	4 February 1929	—	
Portugal	17 June 1925	1 July 1930	Reservation 2 withdrawn in 2003, and reservation 1 withdrawn in 2014.	
Qatar		16 September 1976	—	
Romania	17 June 1925	23 August 1929	Withdrawn in 1991.	
Russia	17 June 1925	5 April 1928	Withdrawn in 2001.	Ratified as the Union of Soviet Socialist Republics.
Rwanda		21 March 1964	Implicit on succession.	Succeeded from Belgium.
Saint Kitts and Nevis		26 October 1989	Implicit on succession.	Succeeded from the United Kingdom.
Saint Lucia		21 December 1988	Implicit on succession.	Succeeded from the United Kingdom.
Saint Vincent and the Grenadines		23 April 1999	Implicit on succession.	Succeeded from the United Kingdom.
Saudi Arabia		27 January 1971	—	
Senegal		15 June 1977	—	
Serbia		20 January 2003	Implicit on succession. Serbia's Parliament voted to withdraw their reservation in May 2009 and the withdrawal was announced in 2010, but the depositary has not been notified.	Succeeded as the Federal Republic of Yugoslavia from the Socialist Federal Republic of Yugoslavia, (Note: Although the FR Yugoslavia claimed to be the continuator state of the SFR of Yugoslavia, the United Nations General Assembly did not accept this and forced them to reapply for membership.) which had ratified the protocol as the Kingdom of Serbs, Croats and Slovenes on 12 April 1929.
Sierra Leone		20 February 1967	—	
Slovakia		1 July 1997 (Note: Listed as 28 October 1997 by the United Nations Office of Disarmament Affairs.)	Withdrawn prior to succession.	Succeeded from Czechoslovakia, which ratified the protocol on 16 August 1938.
Slovenia		8 April 2008	—	
Solomon Islands		1 June 1981	Retained the United Kingdom's reservations on succession.	Succeeded from the United Kingdom.
South Africa		24 May 1930	Withdrawn in 1996.	
South Korea		29 December 1988	Reservation 2 withdrawn in 2002 as regards biological agents covered by the BWC.	
Spain	17 June 1925	22 August 1929	Withdrawn in 1992.	
Sri Lanka		20 January 1954	—	Ratified as the Dominion of Ceylon.
Sudan		17 December 1980	—	
Sweden	17 June 1925	25 April 1930	—	
Switzerland	17 June 1925	12 July 1932	—	
Syria		17 December 1968		
Tajikistan		15 November 2019	—	
Tanzania		28 February 1963	—	Ratified as the Republic of Tanganyika.
Thailand	17 June 1925	6 June 1931	— (Note: Some sources list two reservations by Thailand, but neither the instrument of accession, nor the United Nations Office of Disarmament Affairs list, makes any mention of a reservation.)	Ratified as Siam.
Togo		18 November 1970	—	
Tonga		19 July 1971	Implicit on succession.	Succeeded from the United Kingdom.
Trinidad and Tobago		24 November 1970	Implicit on succession.	Succeeded from the United Kingdom.
Tunisia		12 July 1967	—	
Turkey	17 June 1925	5 October 1929	—	
Uganda		2 April 1965	—	
Ukraine		7 August 2003	Implicit on succession.	Succeeded from the Union of Soviet Socialist Republics.
United Kingdom	17 June 1925	9 April 1930	Reservation 2 withdrawn in 1991 as regards biological agents covered by the BWC, and reservations completely withdrawn in 2002.	
United States of America	17 June 1925	10 April 1975		
Uruguay	17 June 1925	12 April 1977	—	
Uzbekistan		5 October 2020	—	
Venezuela	17 June 1925	8 February 1928	—	
Vietnam		15 December 1980		
Yemen		11 March 1971	Made in a second instrument of accession submitted on 16 September 1973. (Note: According to the Vienna Convention on the Law of Treaties, states may make a reservation when "signing, ratifying, accepting, approving or acceding to a treaty".)	Ratified as the Yemen Arab Republic. Also ratified by the People's Democratic Republic of Yemen on 20 October 1986, prior to Yemeni unification in 1990.

Parties with withdrawn reservations
Parties with implicit reservations
Parties with unwithdrawn reservations limiting the applicability of provisions of the Protocol

Reservations

== Non-signatory states ==
The remaining UN member states and UN observers that have not acceded or succeeded to the Protocol are:

- Andorra
- Azerbaijan
- Bahamas
- Belarus
- Belize
- Bosnia
- Botswana
- Brunei
- Burundi
- Chad
- Comoros
- Democratic Republic of the Congo
- Republic of the Congo
- Djibouti
- Dominica
- Eritrea
- Gabon
- Georgia
- Guinea
- Guyana
- Haiti
- Honduras
- Kiribati
- Mali
- Marshall Islands
- Mauritania
- Micronesia
- Montenegro
- Mozambique
- Myanmar
- Namibia
- Nauru
- Oman
- Palau
- Samoa
- San Marino
- São Tomé and Príncipe
- Seychelles
- Singapore
- Somalia
- South Sudan
- Suriname
- Timor-Leste
- Turkmenistan
- Tuvalu
- United Arab Emirates
- Uzbekistan
- Vanuatu
- Zambia
- Zimbabwe

== Chemical weapons prohibitions ==
Year	Name	Effect
1675	Strasbourg Agreement	The first international agreement limiting the use of chemical weapons, in this case, poison bullets.
1874	Brussels Convention on the Law and Customs of War	Prohibited the employment of poison or poisoned weapons (Never entered into force.)
1899	1st Peace Conference at the Hague	Signatories agreed to abstain from "the use of projectiles the object of which is the diffusion of asphyxiating or deleterious gases."
1907	2nd Peace Conference at the Hague	The Conference added the use of poison or poisoned weapons.
1919	Treaty of Versailles	Prohibited poison gas in Germany.
1922	Treaty relating to the Use of Submarines and Noxious Gases in Warfare	Failed because France objected to clauses relating to submarine warfare.
1925	Geneva Protocol	Prohibited the "use in war of asphyxiating, poisonous or other gases, and of all analogous liquids, materials or devices" and "bacteriological methods" in international conflicts.
1972	Biological and Toxins Weapons Convention	No verification mechanism, negotiations for a protocol to make up this lack halted by USA in 2001.
1993	Chemical Weapons Convention	Comprehensive bans on development, production, stockpiling and use of chemical weapons, with destruction timelines.
1998	Rome Statute of the International Criminal Court	Makes it a war crime to employ chemical weapons in international conflicts. (2010 amendment extends prohibition to internal conflicts.)
