= Conference on Disarmament =

Multilateral disarmament forum

- Emblem of the United Nations, the body to which the Conference on Disarmament is informally related
- Abbreviation: CD
- Predecessor: Committee on Disarmament (1979–1984)
- Formation: 1984; 42 years ago
- Type: International
- Legal status: Active
- Purpose: Discussing and debating disarmament issues, and making recommendations
- Headquarters: Palais des Nations
- Members: 65 Countries
- Secretary-General (ex officio): Tatiana Valovaya
- Website: Official Website

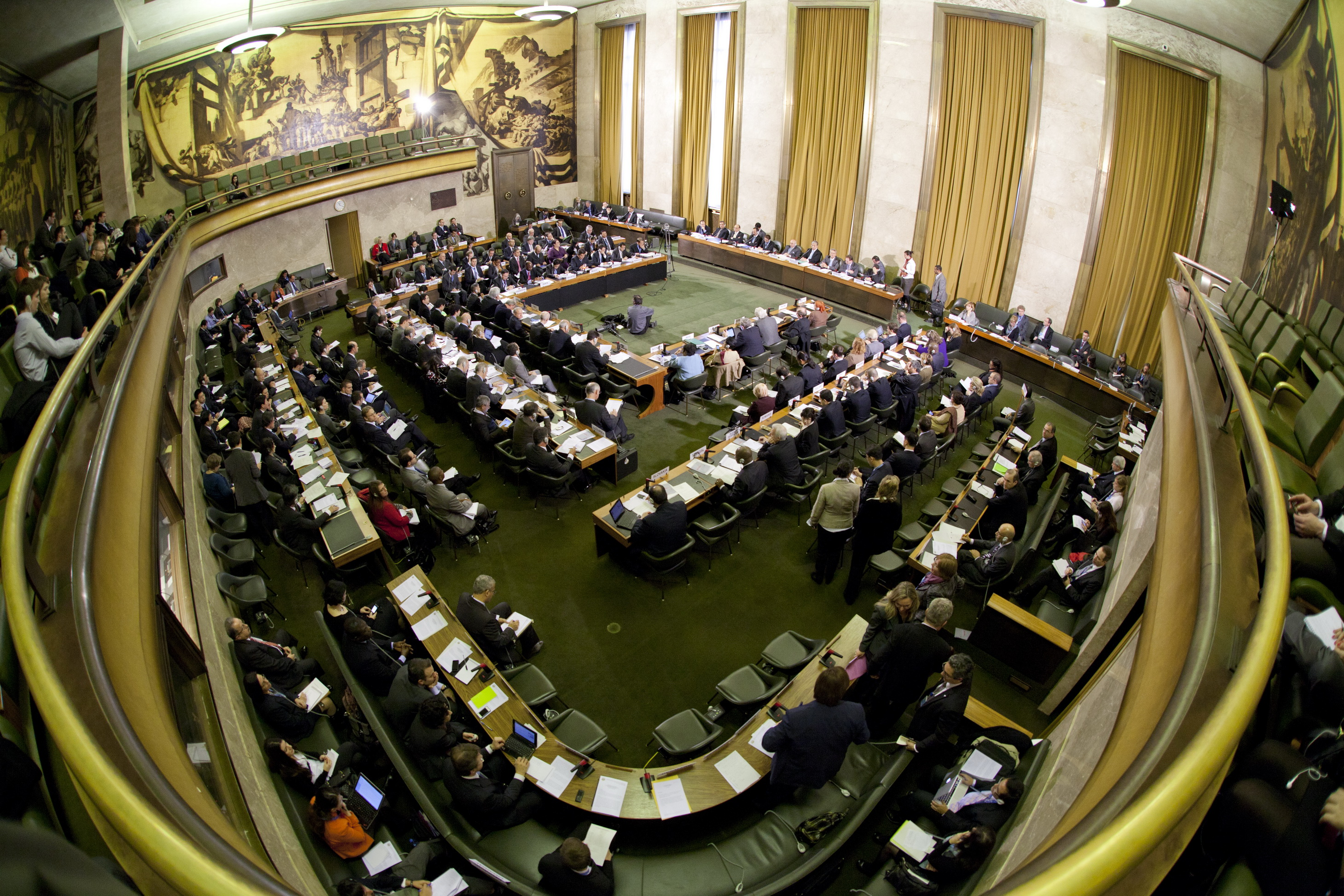
A meeting of the Conference on Disarmament in the Council Chamber of the Palace of Nations

The Conference on Disarmament (CD) is a multilateral disarmament forum established by the international community to negotiate arms control and disarmament agreements based at the Palais des Nations in Geneva. The Conference meets annually in three separate sessions in Geneva.

== History ==
The Conference was first established in 1979 as the Committee on Disarmament as the single multilateral disarmament negotiating forum of the international community. It was renamed the Conference on Disarmament in 1984.

The Conference succeeded three other disarmament-related bodies: the Ten Nation Committee on Disarmament (1960), the Eighteen Nation Committee on Disarmament (1962–1968) and the Conference of the Committee on Disarmament (1969–1978).

The Conference was created with a permanent agenda, also known as the "Decalogue", which includes the following topics:

- Nuclear weapons in all aspects
- Other weapons of mass destruction
- Conventional weapons
- Reduction of military budgets
- Reduction of armed forces
- Disarmament and development
- Disarmament and international security
- Collateral measures; confidence building measures; effective verification methods in relation to appropriate disarmament measures, acceptable to all parties
- Comprehensive programme of disarmament leading to general and complete disarmament under effective international control

Additionally, all decisions of the body must be agreed upon by consensus according to the rules and procedures of the conference.

== Relationship to the United Nations ==
The Conference is formally independent from the United Nations. However, while it is not formally a UN organization, it is linked to it in various ways. First and foremost, the Director-General of the United Nations Office at Geneva serves as the Secretary-General of the Conference. Furthermore, while the Conference adopts its own rules of procedure and agenda, the United Nations General Assembly can pass resolutions recommending specific topics to the Conference. Finally, the Conference submits a report of its activities to the General Assembly yearly, or more frequently, as appropriate.

The Conference on Disarmament Secretariat and Conference Support Branch of the United Nations Office for Disarmament Affairs, based in Geneva, provides organizational and substantive servicing to the Conference on Disarmament, the single multilateral disarmament negotiating forum of the international community.

== Work of the Conference ==
Initially, the Conference and its predecessors were successful in meeting their mandate. They were instrumental in drafting numerous arms control agreements: most importantly, the Treaty on the Non-Proliferation of Nuclear Weapons (1968), the Biological Weapons Convention (1972), the Chemical Weapons Convention (1993) and the Comprehensive Nuclear-Test-Ban Treaty (1996).

However, the work of the body was stalled for over a decade, as members were unable to agree on a work program after the passage of the Comprehensive Nuclear-Test-Ban Treaty. Difficulties included strained relations between key players, disagreement among members on the prioritization of issues, and attempts of some countries to link progress in one area to parallel progress in other areas.

Then, in 2009 a breakthrough was made by the body when it established several working groups to tackle various topics under the Conference's authority. These group focused on: negotiating a treaty banning the production of fissile material for nuclear weapons (FMCT), creating practical steps to reduce nuclear weapons, Prevention of an Arms Race in Outer Space (PAROS) and addressing negative security assurances.

Negotiations for the 2017 Treaty on the Prohibition of Nuclear Weapons took place at the United Nations, and not at the Conference. This was due to the general dysfunction of the Conference and its limited membership, but also to the profound divisions among Member States on how to reach the goal of nuclear disarmament.

Most recently, at the beginning of the 2025 under Italian presidency, the Conference on Disarmament adopted Decision 2443 by consensus. The Decision re-established five subsidiary bodies (SBs), re-appointed their respective coordinators and agreed on a calendar of meetings for these SBs.

== Membership ==
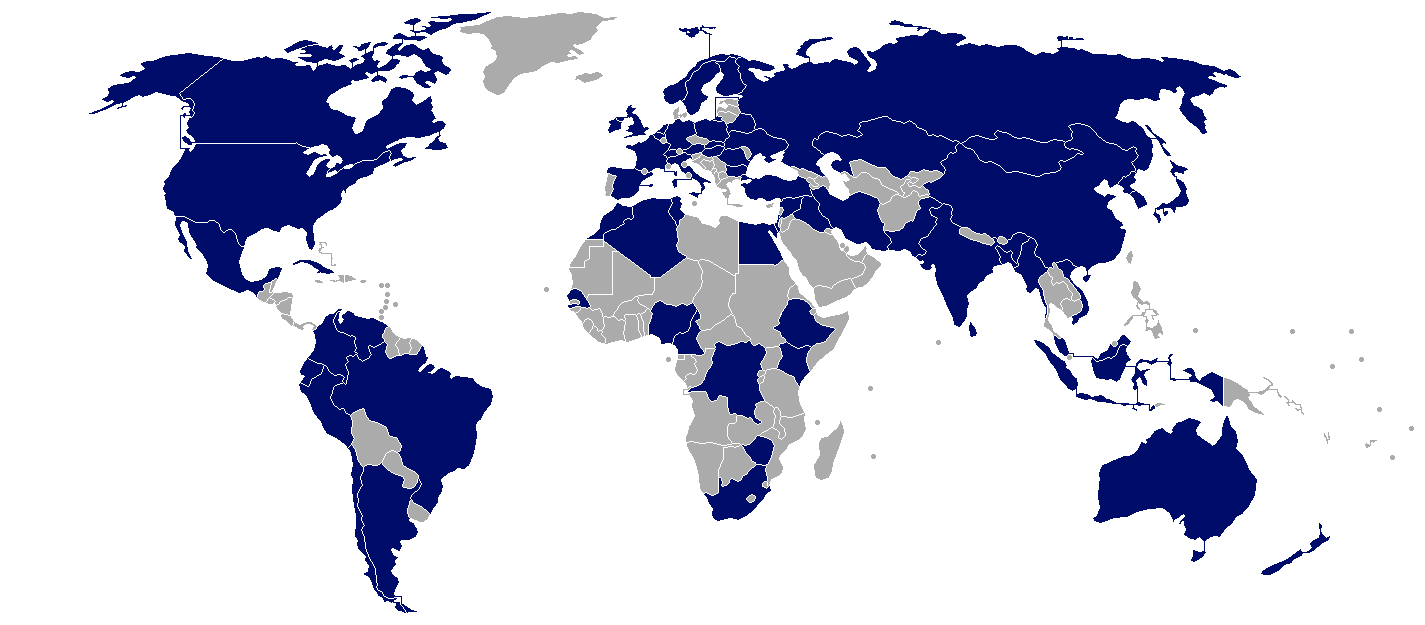
Member countries of the Conference on Disarmament

The conference is currently composed of 65 formal members, representing all areas of the world, as well as all known nuclear-weapon states. Additionally, members are organized into a number of informal regional groups to facilitate their preparation for, and representation in the plenary meetings of the Conference.

=== Western European and Others Group (WEOG) ===
Argentina	Australia	Austria	Belgium	Canada
Finland	France	Germany	Hungary	Ireland
Israel	Italy	Japan	Netherlands	New Zealand
Norway	Poland	Republic of Korea	Slovakia	Spain
Sweden	Switzerland	Turkey	United Kingdom	United States

=== Group of 21 (G-21) ===
Algeria	Bangladesh	Brazil	Cameroon	Chile
Colombia	Cuba	DPRK	DRC	Ecuador
Egypt	Ethiopia	India	Indonesia	Islamic Republic of Iran
Iraq	Kenya	Malaysia	Mexico	Mongolia
Morocco	Myanmar	Nigeria	Pakistan	Peru
Senegal	South Africa	Sri Lanka	Syrian Arab Republic	Tunisia
Venezuela	Vietnam	Zimbabwe		

=== Eastern European Group (EEG) ===
Belarus	Bulgaria	Kazakhstan
Romania	Russian Federation	Ukraine

=== Group of One ===
China

=== Non-member States ===
Additionally, a number of states participate in meetings of the Conference as Non-member States:

Albania	Angola	Armenia	Azerbaijan
Bosnia and Herzegovina	Costa Rica	Cyprus	Czech Republic
Dominican Republic	Estonia	Georgia	Greece
Guatemala	Holy See	Kuwait	Kyrgyzstan
Lao PDR	Latvia	Lithuania	Luxembourg
Malta	Montenegro	Nicaragua	North Macedonia
Oman	Panama	Philippines	Portugal
Qatar	Moldova	Serbia	Singapore
Slovenia	Tajikistan	Thailand	Togo
UAE

== See also ==
- United Nations Office for Disarmament Affairs
- Conference for the Reduction and Limitation of Armaments
