= Ten Nation Committee on Disarmament =

Cold War-era committee

The Ten Nation Committee on Disarmament (TNCD) was designed to address the issue of nuclear disarmament during the Cold War. Created through the combination of a United Nations resolution and an agreement between the Big Four powers, the TNCD began work in March 1960. It remained intact from March - June 1960.

== History ==
The 1960 Ten Nation Committee on Disarmament grew out of the 1959 Big Four meeting in Berlin. At the meeting, the Big Four powers (United States, United Kingdom, France, Soviet Union) decided to resume previously halted disarmament talks and establish a new international negotiating forum. Out of this agreement came the authority for a September 7, 1959 United Nations (UN) resolution of the UN Disarmament Commission, which created the Ten Nation Committee on Disarmament. The short-lived TNCD officially began its work in Geneva, Switzerland, on March 15, 1960.

The TNCD's work was divided into two short sessions. The first spanned the period from March 15 - April 29, 1960, on the 29th the committee halted work because of the concurrent Paris Summit. The hiatus lasted until June 7, 1960 when the TNCD reconvened, once again in Geneva. The TNCD's second session was also short. On June 28, 1960 the committee adjourned indefinitely in the aftermath of the failure at the Paris Summit and the U-2 spy plane incident.

== Members ==
The committee was based on equal representation and included five Warsaw Pact nations and five NATO nations.

Original members of TNCD: (Western Bloc) - Canada, France, Great Britain, Italy, United States. (Eastern Bloc) - Bulgaria, Czechoslovakia, Poland, Romania, Soviet Union.

== Results and legacy ==
The TNCD (1960) was one of several predecessors to the current UN disarmament organization, the Conference on Disarmament (CD). The TNCD preceded the Eighteen Nation Committee on Disarmament (1962–69), which was succeeded by the Conference of the Committee on Disarmament (CCD) (1969–78) until the CD was formed in 1979.
