= Strasbourg Agreement (1675) =

1675 treaty banning the use of chemical weapons

The Strasbourg Agreement of 27 August 1675 is the first international agreement banning the use of chemical weapons. The treaty was signed between France and the Holy Roman Empire, and was created in response to the use of poisoned bullets. The use of this weaponry was preceded by Leonardo da Vinci's invention of arsenic and sulfur-packed shells that can be fired against ships. These weapons had been used by Christoph Bernhard von Galen, Bishop of Munster, in the Siege of Groningen (1672) – thus provoking the Strasbourg Agreement between the belligerents of the Franco-Dutch War.

The Hague Convention of 1899 also contained a provision that rejected the use of projectiles capable of diffusing asphyxiating or deleterious gases. The next major agreement on chemical weapons did not occur until the 1925 Geneva Protocol. Today, the prohibition on the use of chemical weapons is different from the use of poison as a method of warfare and is particularly noted by the International Committee of the Red Cross as existing independently.

== See also ==
- 1874 Brussels conference (no accord, but recommended banning the use of poisonous or poisoned weapons)
- Hague Declaration of 1899 (outlawing "the use of projectiles the sole object of which is the diffusion of asphyxiating or deleterious gases.")
- 1919 Treaty of Versailles
