= United Nations Secretary-General's Mechanism =

International mechanism to investigate alleged biological and chemical weapons use

United Nations Secretary-General’s Mechanism
- United Nations Secretary-General’s Mechanism for Investigation of Alleged Use of Chemical and Biological Weapons
- Abbreviation: UNSGM
- Founded: 1987; 39 years ago
- Type: United Nations mechanism
- Legal status: Active
- Purpose: Investigations of alleged biological and chemical weapons use
- Parent organization: United Nations Office for Disarmament Affairs
- Website: www.un.org/disarmament/wmd/secretary-general-mechanism/

The United Nations Secretary-General's Mechanism for Investigation of Alleged Use of Chemical and Biological Weapons (UNSGM), is a tool that allows the Secretary-General to investigate alleged uses of biological or chemical weapons. The UNSGM is not a standing investigative body, but instead relies on a member state-provided list of qualified experts, consultants, and analytical laboratories that may be activated on short notice to support UNSGM investigations.

== Process and mandate ==
Any UN member state may request the Secretary-General to launch an investigation into a possible biological or chemical weapons use. The Secretary-General has the authority to dispatch a fact-finding mission to the site of the alleged incident, and to report the investigation results to the international community.

The UN Office for Disarmament Affairs (UNODA) is the custodian of the UNSGM and maintains its operational readiness. As such, UNODA keeps an updated roster of qualified experts, experts consultants, and analytical laboratories that may be called upon to participate in or advise UNSGM investigations. As of 2022, the UNSGM roster includes approximately 500 qualified experts, 40 expert consultants, and 80 analytical laboratories. In addition, UNODA facilitates specialized training courses for the qualified experts and conducts outreach activities.

== Relationship with international treaties ==
Regarding biological weapons, the UNSGM is separate and independent from the Biological Weapons Convention (BWC). Since the BWC lacks an international institution to verify and enforce member states' compliance with the treaty, the UNSGM remains the only international mechanism for investigations into alleged uses of biological weapons.

On the chemical weapons side, the Organisation for the Prohibition of Chemical Weapons (OPCW) implements the Chemical Weapons Convention (CWC). OPCW was created in 1997, the year the CWC entered into force, and is mandated to investigate allegations of chemical weapons use, with the exception of investigations in states that have not joined the CWC. Even in the latter case, the OPCW supports the Secretary-General in conducting investigations.

== Past investigations ==
The UNSGM was activated three times to date, each time to investigate the alleged use of chemical weapons.

States	Year	Type	Conclusion	Report
Mozambique	1992	Chemical	Negative. "We cannot conclude that a chemical warfare agent was used in the attack."	S/24065
Azerbaijan	1992	Chemical	Negative. "In sum, no evidence of chemical weapons was presented to the team."	S/24344
Syria	2013	Chemical	Positive. "chemical weapons have been used in the ongoing conflict between the parties in the Syrian Arab Republic."	S/2013/735

== See also ==
- Geneva Protocol
- Biological Weapons Convention
- Chemical Weapons Convention
