= Project Clear Vision =

Project Clear Vision was a covert examination of Soviet-made biological bomblets conducted by the Battelle Memorial Institute under contract with the CIA. The legality of this project under the Biological Weapons Convention (BWC) of 1972 is disputed.

== History ==
=== The operation ===
Project Clear Vision was conducted between 1997 and 2000, during the Clinton Administration. The project's stated goal was to assess the efficacy of bio-agent dissemination from bomblets. The program received criticism due to suspicions that its findings could possibly be used in a covert US bioweapons program.

=== Reportage ===
The secret project was disclosed in a September 2001 article in The New York Times. Reporters Judith Miller, Stephen Engelberg and William J. Broad collaborated to write the article. Shortly after the article appeared, the authors published a book that further elaborated the story. The 2001 book, Germs: Biological Weapons and America's Secret War, and the article are the only publicly available sources concerning Project Clear Vision and its sister projects, Bacchus and Jefferson.

== Legality ==
As signatory to the BWC, the United States is committed to refrain from development of bioweapons. Moreover, the US did not disclose the secret project in its annual confidence-building measure (CBM) declarations. The US maintains that the program was fully consistent with the BWC because the project was defensive in nature.
