= Project Jefferson =

Covert program by the U.S. Defense Intelligence Agency

Project Jefferson was a covert U.S. Defense Intelligence Agency program designed to determine if the current anthrax vaccine was effective against genetically modified bacteria. The program's legal status under the 1972 Biological Weapons Convention (BWC) is disputed.

== History ==
=== The operation ===
Project Jefferson began in 1997 and was designed to reproduce a strain of genetically modified anthrax isolated by Russian scientists during the 1990s. The goal was to determine whether or not the strain was resistant to the commercially available U.S. anthrax vaccine.

=== Reportage ===
The project was disclosed in a September 4, 2001 article in The New York Times. Reporters Judith Miller, Stephen Engelberg and William J. Broad collaborated to write the article. It is presumed that the reporters had knowledge of the program for at least several months; shortly after the article appeared they published a book that detailed the story further. The 2001 book, Germs: Biological Weapons and America's Secret War, and the article are the only publicly available sources detailing Project Jefferson and its sister projects, Bacchus and Clear Vision.

== Legality ==
Project Jefferson was operated by the Defense Intelligence Agency and reviewed by lawyers at the Pentagon. Those lawyers determined that Project Jefferson was in line with the BWC. Despite assertions from the Clinton and Bush administrations that the project, and its sisters, were legal, several international legal scholars disagreed.

The clandestine program was, notably, omitted from BWC confidence-building measure (CBM) declarations. These measures were introduced to the BWC in 1986 and 1991 to strengthen the treaty, the U.S. had long been a proponent of their value and some asserted that these tests damaged American credibility. U.S. desire to keep such programs secret was, according to Bush administration officials, a "significant reason" that Bush rejected a draft agreement signed by 143 nations to strengthen the BWC.
