= Biological Weapons Convention =

1975 treaty that comprehensively bans biological weapons

Convention on the Prohibition of the Development, Production and Stockpiling of Bacteriological (Biological) and Toxin Weapons and on their Destruction
Participation in the Biological Weapons Convention
Signed and ratified
Acceded or succeeded
Unrecognized state, abiding by treaty
Only signed
Non-signatory
- Signed: 10 April 1972
- Location: London, Moscow, and Washington, D.C.
- Effective: 26 March 1975
- Condition: Ratification by 22 states, including the three depositaries
- Signatories: 109
- Parties: 189 (complete list); 8 non-parties: Chad, Djibouti, Egypt (signatory), Eritrea, Haiti (signatory), Israel, Somalia (signatory), and Syria (signatory).
- Depositary: United States, United Kingdom, Russian Federation (successor to the Soviet Union)
- Languages: Chinese, English, French, Russian and Spanish

Full text
- Biological Weapons Convention at Wikisource

The Biological Weapons Convention (BWC), or Biological and Toxin Weapons Convention (BTWC), is a disarmament treaty that effectively bans biological and toxin weapons by prohibiting their development, production, acquisition, transfer, stockpiling and use. The treaty's full name is the Convention on the Prohibition of the Development, Production and Stockpiling of Bacteriological (Biological) and Toxin Weapons and on their Destruction.

Having entered into force on 26 March 1975, the BWC was the first multilateral disarmament treaty to ban the production of an entire category of weapons of mass destruction. The convention is of unlimited duration. As of May 2025, 189 states have become party to the treaty. Four additional states have signed but not ratified the treaty, and another four states have neither signed nor acceded to the treaty.

The BWC is considered to have established a strong global norm against biological weapons. This norm is reflected in the treaty's preamble, which states that the use of biological weapons would be "repugnant to the conscience of mankind". It is also demonstrated by the fact that not a single state today declares to possess or seek biological weapons, or asserts that their use in war is legitimate. In light of the rapid advances in biotechnology, biodefense expert Daniel Gerstein has described the BWC as "the most important arms control treaty of the twenty-first century". However, the convention's effectiveness has been limited due to insufficient institutional support and the absence of any formal verification regime to monitor compliance. The treaty has seen notable violations in offensive biological weapons programs of the Soviet Union, and of Ba'athist Iraq. Its Article VI mechanism for complaint of a violation has been invoked once, by Russia in 2022, regarding the debunked Ukraine bioweapons conspiracy theory.

== History ==
While the history of biological warfare goes back more than six centuries to the Siege of Caffa in 1346 CE, international restrictions on biological warfare began only with the 1925 Geneva Protocol, which prohibits the use but not the possession or development of chemical and biological weapons. Upon ratification of the Geneva Protocol, several countries made reservations regarding its applicability and use in retaliation. Due to these reservations, it was in practice a "no-first-use" agreement only. In particular, it did not prevent multiple states from starting and scaling offensive biological weapons programs, including the United States (active from 1943 to 1969) and the Soviet Union (active from the 1920s until at least 1992).

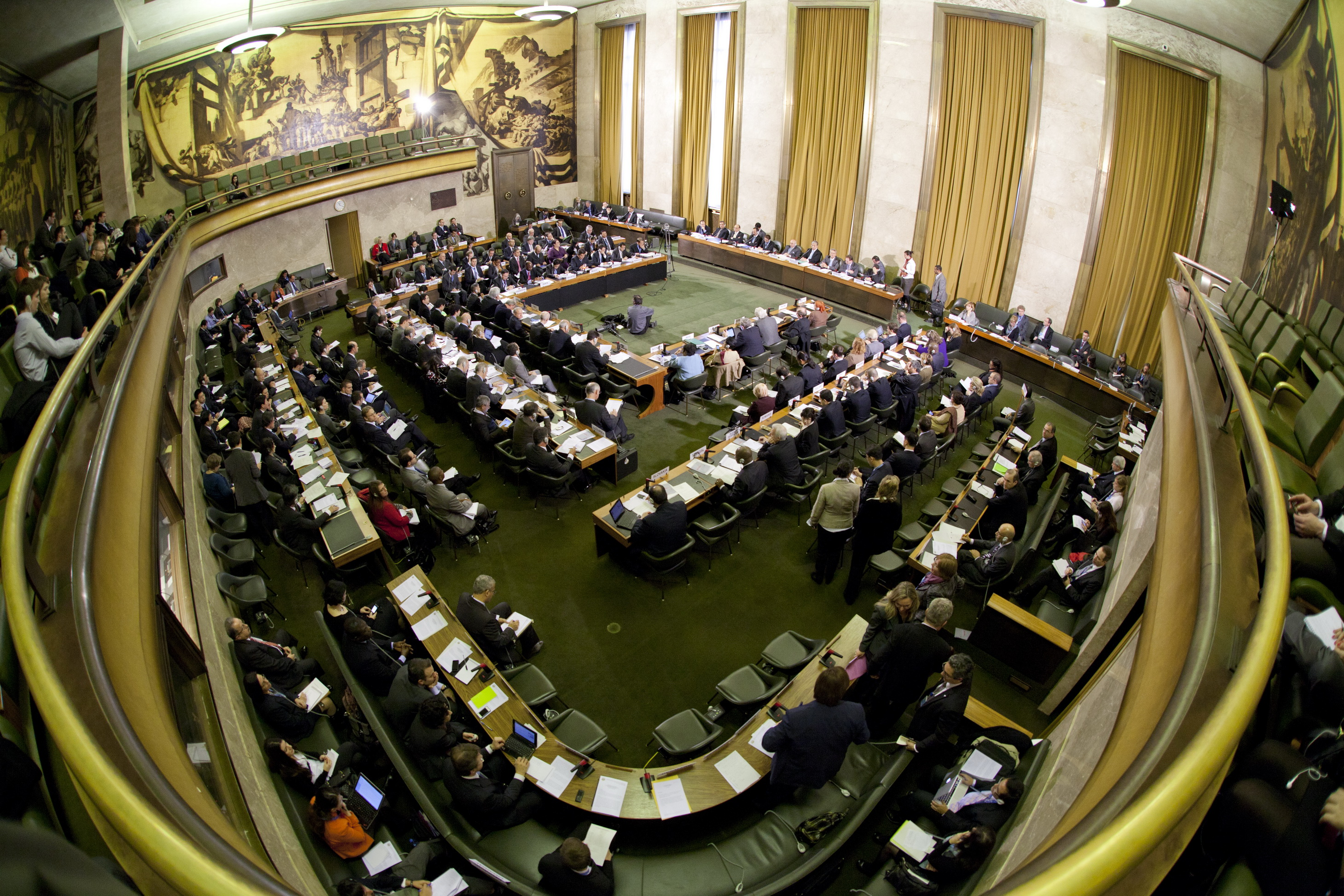
The Council Chamber at the Palace of Nations in Geneva where the BWC was negotiated

The American biowarfare system was terminated in 1969 by President Nixon when he issued his Statement on Chemical and Biological Defense Policies and Programs. The statement ended, unconditionally, all U.S. offensive biological weapons programs. When Nixon ended the program the budget was $300 million annually.

The BWC sought to supplement the Geneva Protocol and was negotiated in the Conference of the Committee on Disarmament in Geneva from 1969 to 1972, following the conclusion of the negotiation of the Treaty on the Non-Proliferation of Nuclear Weapons. Of significance was a 1968 British proposal to separate consideration of chemical and biological weapons and to first negotiate a convention on biological weapons. The negotiations gained further momentum when the United States decided to unilaterally end its offensive biological weapons program in 1969 and support the British proposal. In March 1971, the Soviet Union and its allies reversed their earlier opposition to the separation of chemical and biological weapons and tabled their own draft convention. The final negotiation stage was reached when the United States and the Soviet Union submitted identical but separate drafts of the BWC text on 5 August 1971. The BWC was opened for signature on 10 April 1972 with ceremonies in London, Moscow, and Washington, D.C., and it entered into force on 26 March 1975 after the ratification by 22 states, including its three depositary governments (the Soviet Union, the United Kingdom, and the United States).

There have been some concerned scientists who have called for the modernization of the BWC at the periodic Review Conferences. For example, Filippa Lentzos and Gregory Koblentz pointed out in 2016 that "crucial contemporary debates about new developments" for the BWC Review Conferences included "gain-of-function experiments, potential pandemic pathogens, CRISPR and other genome editing technologies, gene drives, and synthetic biology".

== Treaty obligations ==
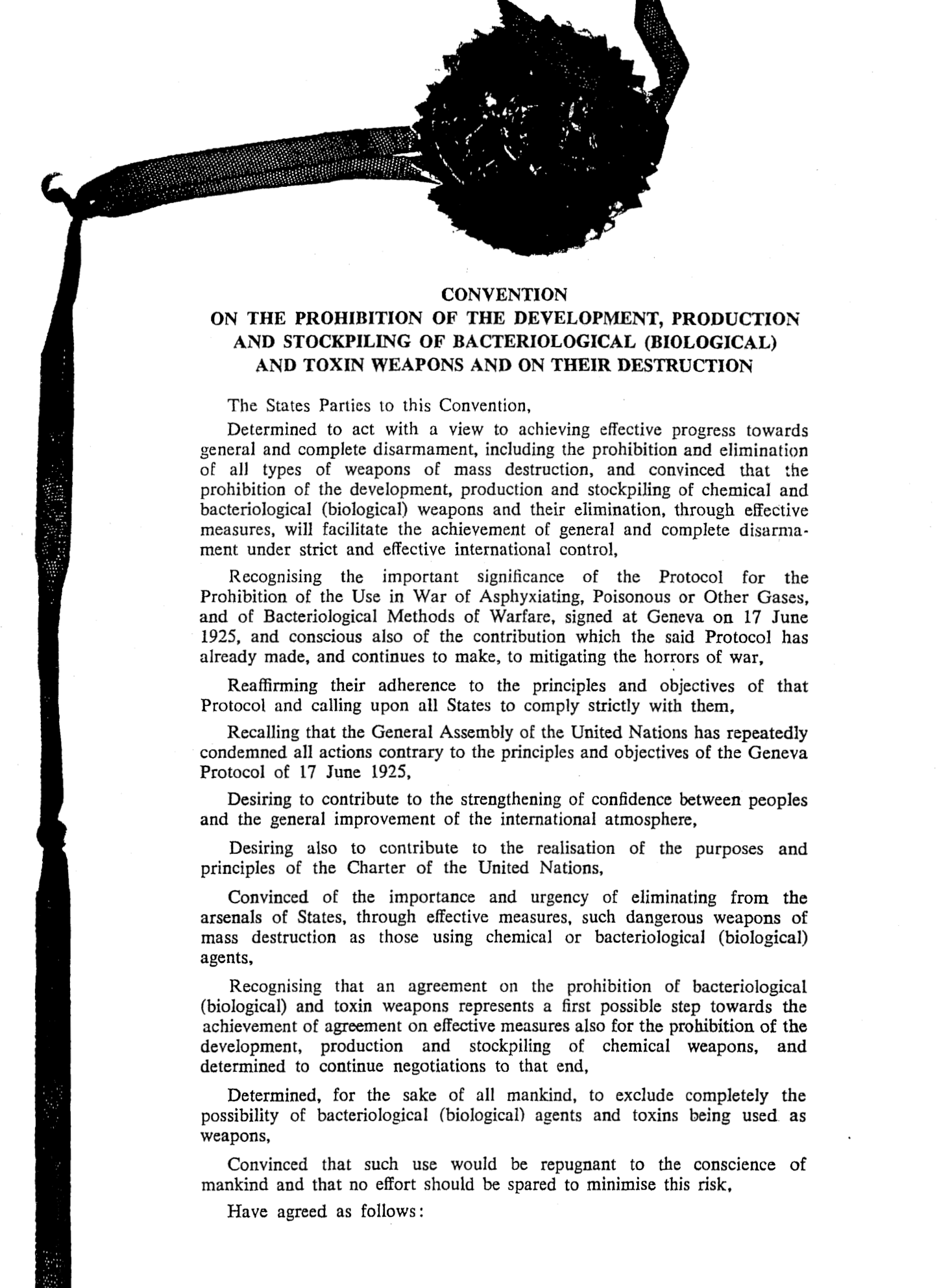
The Biological Weapons Convention

With only 15 articles, the BWC is relatively short. Over time, the treaty has been interpreted and supplemented by additional politically binding agreements and understandings reached by its States Parties at eight subsequent Review Conferences.

=== Summary of key articles ===
- Article I: Never under any circumstances to develop, produce, stockpile, acquire, or retain biological weapons.
- Article II: To destroy or divert to peaceful purposes biological weapons and associated resources prior to joining.
- Article III: Not to transfer, or in any way assist, encourage, or induce anyone else to acquire or retain biological weapons.
- Article IV: To take any national measures necessary to implement the provisions of the BWC domestically.
- Article V: Undertaking to consult bilaterally and multilaterally and cooperate in solving any problems which may arise in relation to the objective, or in the application, of the BWC.
- Article VI: Right to request the United Nations Security Council to investigate alleged breaches of the BWC and undertaking to cooperate in carrying out any investigation initiated by the Security Council.
- Article VII: To assist States which have been exposed to danger as a result of a violation of the BWC.
- Article X: Undertaking to facilitate, and have the right to participate in, the fullest possible exchange of equipment, materials and information for peaceful purposes.

The remaining articles concern the BWC's compatibility with the 1925 Geneva Protocol (Article VIII), negotiations to prohibit chemical weapons (Article IX), amendments (Article XI), Review Conferences (Article XII), duration (Article XIII, 1), withdrawal (Article XIII, 2), joining the convention, depositary governments, and conditions for entry into force (Article XIV, 1–5), and languages (Article XV).

=== Article I: Prohibition of biological weapons ===
Article I is the core of the BWC and requires each state "never in any circumstances to develop, produce, stockpile or otherwise acquire or retain:

1. microbial or other biological agents, or toxins whatever their origin or method of production, of types and in quantities that have no justification for prophylactic, protective or other peaceful purposes;
2. weapons, equipment or means of delivery designed to use such agents or toxins for hostile purposes or in armed conflict."

Article I does not prohibit any specific biological agents or toxins as such but rather certain purposes for which they may be employed. This prohibition is known as the general-purpose criterion and is also used in Article II, 1 of the 1993 Chemical Weapons Convention (CWC). The general-purpose criterion covers all hostile uses of biological agents, including those developed in the future, and recognizes that biological agents and toxins are inherently dual use. While these agents may be employed for nefarious ends, they also have several legitimate peaceful purposes, including developing medicines and vaccines to counter natural or deliberate disease outbreaks. Against this background, Article I only considers illegitimate those types and quantities of biological agents or toxins and their means of delivery which cannot be justified by prophylactic, protective, or other peaceful purposes; regardless of whether the agents in question affect humans, animals, or plants. A disadvantage of this intent-based approach is a blurring of the line between defensive and offensive biological weapons research.

While it was initially unclear during the early negotiations of the BWC whether viruses would be regulated by it since they lie "at the edge of life"—they possess some but not all of the characteristics of life—viruses were defined as biological agents in 1969 and thus fall within the BWC's scope.

While Article I does not explicitly prohibit the "use" of biological weapons as it was already considered to be prohibited by the 1925 Geneva Protocol, it is still regarded as a violation of the BWC, as reaffirmed by the final document of the Fourth Review Conference in 1996.

=== Article III: Prohibition of transfer and assistance ===
Article III bans the transfer, encouragement, assistance, or inducement of anyone, whether governments or non-state actors, in developing or acquiring any of the agents, toxins, weapons, equipment, or means of delivery specified in Article I. The article's objective is to prevent the proliferation of biological weapons by limiting the availability of materials and technology which may be used for hostile purposes.

=== Article IV: National implementation ===
Article IV obliges BWC States Parties to implement the convention's provisions domestically. This is essential to allow national authorities to investigate, prosecute, and punish any activities prohibited by the BWC; to prevent access to biological agents for harmful purposes; and to detect and respond to the potential use of biological weapons. National implementing measures may take various forms, such as legislation, regulations, codes of conduct, and others. Which implementing measures are adequate for a state depends on several factors, including its legal system, its size and geography, the development of its biotechnology industry, and its participation in regional economic cooperation. Since no one set of measures fits all states, the implementation of specific obligations is left to States Parties' discretion, based on their assessment of what will best enable them to ensure compliance with the BWC.

A database of over 1,500 laws and regulations that States Parties have enacted to implement the BWC domestically is maintained by the non-governmental organization VERTIC. A similar database on national implementation measures developed by VERTIC and the United Nations Institute for Disarmament Research was launched in 2023. These concern the penal code, enforcement measures, import and export controls, biosafety and biosecurity measures, as well as domestic and international cooperation and assistance. For instance, the 1989 Biological Weapons Anti-Terrorism Act implemented the Convention for the United States. A 2023 VERTIC report concluded that "gaps persist in States Parties' legal frameworks for implementing the Convention at the national level". The BWC's Implementation Support Unit issued a background information document on "strengthening national implementation" in 2018 and an update in 2019.

=== Article V: Consultation and cooperation ===
Article V requires States Parties to consult one another and cooperate in disputes concerning the purpose or implementation of the BWC. The Second Review Conference in 1986 agreed on procedures to ensure that alleged violations of the BWC would be promptly addressed at a consultative meeting when requested by a State Party. These procedures were further elaborated by the Third Review Conference in 1991. Two formal consultative meetings have taken place, the first in 1997 at the request of Cuba, and the second in 2022 at the request of the Russian Federation.

=== Article VI: Complaint about an alleged BWC violation ===
Article VI allows States Parties to lodge a complaint with the United Nations Security Council if they suspect a breach of treaty obligations by another state. Moreover, the article requires states to cooperate with any investigation which the Security Council may launch. There is a general unwillingness to invoke Article VI due to the highly political nature of the Security Council, where the five permanent members—China, France, Russia, the United Kingdom, and the United States—hold veto power, including over investigations for alleged treaty violations. One formal complaint pursuant to Article VI has been lodged by the Russian Federation in 2022.

=== Article VII: Assistance after a BWC violation ===
Article VII obliges States Parties to provide assistance to states that so request it if the UN Security Council decides they have been exposed to danger as a result of a violation of the BWC. In addition to helping victims in the event of a biological weapons attack, the purpose of the article is to deter such attacks from occurring in the first place by reducing their potential for harm through international solidarity and assistance. Despite no state ever having invoked Article VII, the article has drawn more attention in recent years, in part due to increasing evidence of terrorist organizations being interested in acquiring biological weapons and also following various naturally occurring epidemics. In 2018, the BWC's Implementation Support Unit issued a background document describing a number of additional understandings and agreements on Article VII that have been reached at past Review Conferences.

=== Article X: Peaceful cooperation ===
Article X protects States Parties' right to exchange biological materials, technology, and information to be used for peaceful purposes. The article states that the implementation of the BWC shall avoid hampering the economic or technological development of States Parties or peaceful international cooperation on biological projects. The Seventh Review Conference in 2011 established an Article X database, which matches voluntary requests and offers for assistance and cooperation among States Parties and international organizations.

== Membership and joining the BWC ==
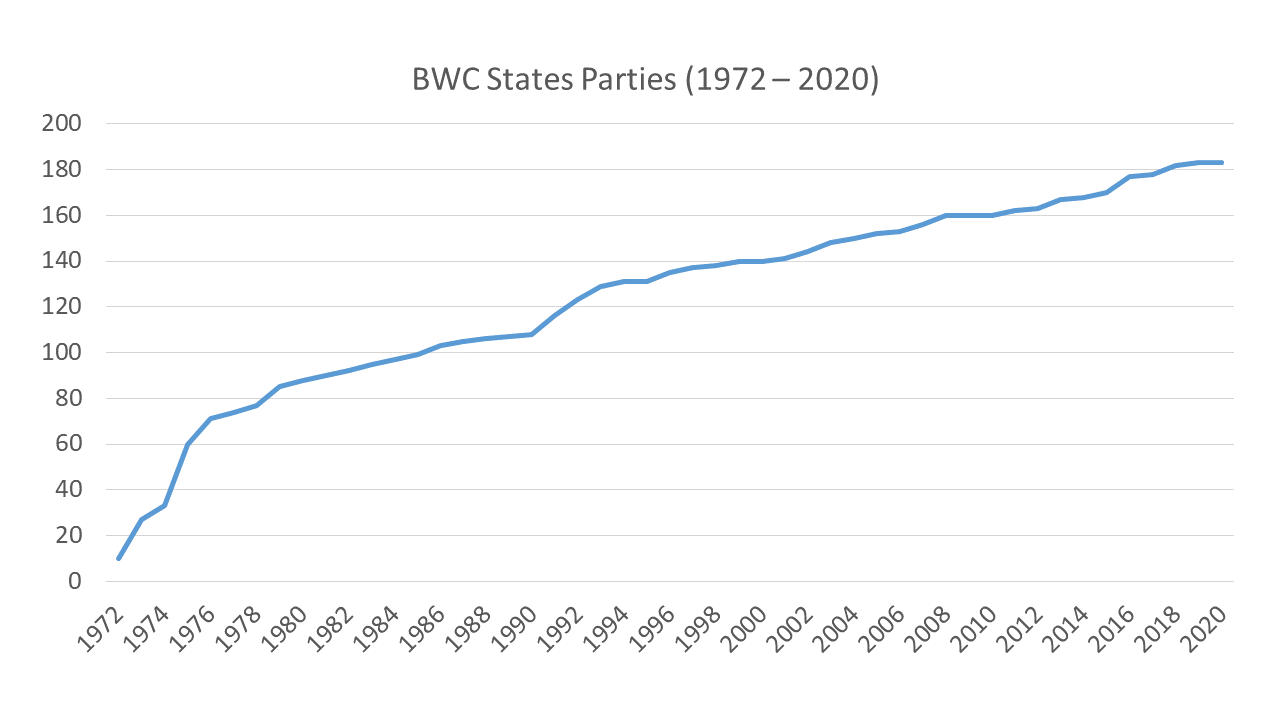
Number of BWC States Parties from 1972 to 2020

The BWC has 189 States Parties as of May 2025, with Kiribati the most recent to become a party. Four states have signed but not ratified the treaty: Egypt, Haiti, Somalia, and Syria. Four additional states have neither signed nor acceded to the treaty: Chad, Djibouti, Eritrea and Israel. For one of these four non-signatory states—Chad—significant progress toward joining the BWC has been achieved; another of the four (Djibouti) has begun to "identify concrete steps" toward its own accession, while—of the four non-ratifying signatories—a similar situation obtains for Somalia (albeit with the "concrete steps" here referring to progress toward ratification, rather than accession).

The BWC's degree of universality remains low compared to other weapons of mass destruction regimes, including the Chemical Weapons Convention with 193 parties and the Treaty on the Non-Proliferation of Nuclear Weapons with 191 parties.

States can join the BWC through either ratification, accession or succession, in accordance with their national constitutional processes, which often require parliamentary approval. Ratification applies to states which had previously signed the treaty before it entered into force in 1975. Since then, signing the treaty is no longer possible, but states can accede to it. Succession concerns newly independent states that accept to be bound by a treaty that the predecessor state had joined. The Convention enters into force on the date when an instrument of ratification, accession, or succession is deposited with at least one of the depositary governments (the Russian Federation, the United Kingdom, and the United States).

Several countries made reservations when ratifying the BWC declaring that it did not imply their complete satisfaction that the treaty allows the stockpiling of biological agents and toxins for "prophylactic, protective or other peaceful purposes", nor should it imply recognition of other countries they do not recognize.

=== JACKSNNZ ===
JACKSNNZ (pronounced "Jacksons") is the colloquial name of an informal grouping of the world's affluent non-EU countries, excluding the United States, within the context of the convention. The JACKSNNZ states are Japan, Australia, Canada, South Korea, Switzerland, Norway and New Zealand. The term originated in the proceedings to the Sixth Review Conference of the Biological and Toxins Weapons Convention held in Geneva in 2006. In the previous review, conference talks broke down over American refusals to allow for a verification mechanism be established to monitor biological weapons programs in states parties. This was against the wishes of other Western European and Others Group (WEOG) states, which also include Canada, Turkey, Australasia and Western Europe. At the 2006 Review Conference the JACKSNNZ states remain supportive of a verification protocol (although are unlikely to push for it knowing that the current US government will not accede on this point). However, the JACKSNNZ also seeks balance within the WEOG, and to protect the interests of non-EU states. Takeshi Aoki, director of the Bioweapons and Chemical Weapons Conventions Division of the Japanese Ministry of Foreign Affairs, said that JACKSNNZ is "neither a binding instrument, nor an exclusive one."

== Verification and compliance ==
=== Confidence-building measures ===
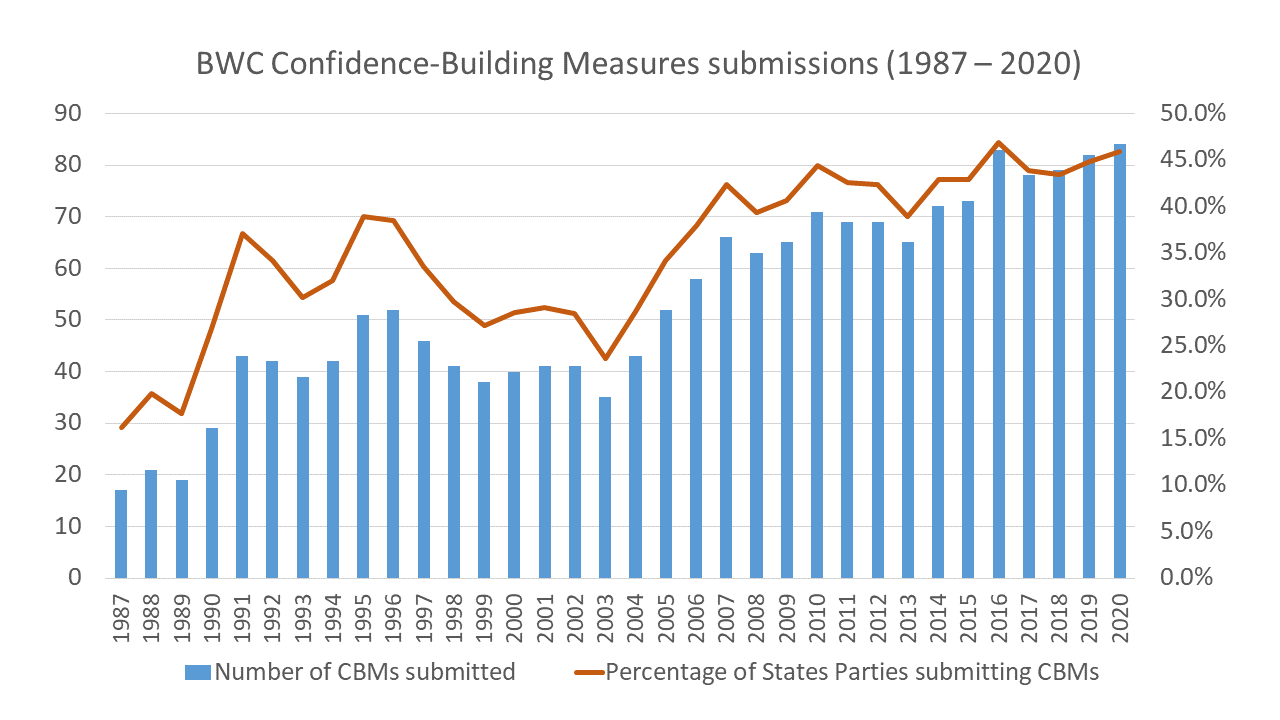
Number and percentage of BWC confidence-building measures submissions from 1987 to 2020

At the Second Review Conference in 1986, BWC States Parties agreed to strengthen the treaty by exchanging annual confidence-building measures (CBMs). These politically binding reports aim to prevent or reduce the occurrence of ambiguities, doubts and suspicions, and at improving international cooperation on peaceful biological activities. CBMs are the main formal mechanism through which States Parties regularly exchange compliance-related information. After revisions by the Third, Sixth, and Seventh Review Conferences, the current CBM form requires states to provide information annually on six issues (CBM D was deleted by the Seventh Review Conference in 2011):

- CBM A: (i) research centres and laboratories, and (ii) national biological defence research and development programs
- CBM B: outbreaks of infectious diseases and similar occurrences caused by toxins
- CBM C: efforts to promote research results
- CBM E: legislation, regulations, and other measures
- CBM F: past activities in offensive and/or defensive biological research and development programs
- CBM G: vaccine production facilities

While the number of CBM submissions has increased over time, the overall participation rate remains slightly above 50 percent. In 2018, an online CBM platform was launched to facilitate the electronic submission of CBM reports. An increasing number of states are making their CBM reports publicly available on the platform, but many reports remain only accessible to other states. The history and implementation of the CBM system have been described by the BWC Implementation Support Unit in a 2022 report to the Ninth Review Conference.

=== Failed negotiation of a verification protocol ===
Unlike the chemical or nuclear weapons regimes, the BWC lacks both a system to verify states' compliance with the treaty and a separate international organization to support the convention's effective implementation. Agreement on such a system was not feasible at the time the BWC was negotiated, largely due to Cold War politics but also due to a belief it was not necessary and that the BWC would be difficult to verify. U.S. biological weapons expert Jonathan B. Tucker commented that "this lack of an enforcement mechanism has undermined the effectiveness of the BWC, as it is unable to prevent systematic violations".

Earlier drafts of the BWC included limited provisions for addressing compliance issues, but these were removed during the negotiation process. Some countries attempted to reintroduce these provisions when the BWC text was submitted to the General Assembly in 1971 but were unsuccessful, as were attempts led by Sweden at the First Review Conference in 1980.

Following the end of the Cold War, a long negotiation process to add a verification mechanism began in 1991, when the Third Review Conference established an expert group on verification, VEREX, with the mandate to identify and examine potential verification measures from a scientific and technical standpoint. During four meetings in 1992 and 1993, VEREX considered 21 verification measures, including inspections of facilities, monitoring relevant publications, and other on-site and off-site measures. Another stimulus came from the successful negotiation of the Chemical Weapons Convention, which opened for signature in 1993.

Subsequently, a Special Conference of BWC States Parties in 1994 considered the VEREX report and decided to establish an Ad Hoc Group to negotiate a legally-binding verification protocol. The Ad Hoc Group convened 24 sessions between 1995 and 2001, during which it negotiated a draft protocol to the BWC which would establish an international organization and introduce a verification system. This organization would employ inspectors who would regularly visit declared biological facilities on-site and could also investigate specific suspect facilities and activities. Nonetheless, states found it difficult to agree on several fundamental issues, including export controls and the scope of on-site visits. By early 2001, the "rolling text" of the draft protocol still contained many areas on which views diverged widely.

In March 2001, a 210-page draft protocol was circulated by the chairman of the Ad Hoc Group, which attempted to resolve the contested issues. However, at the 24th session of the Ad Hoc Group in July 2001 the George W. Bush administration rejected both the draft protocol circulated by the Group's Chairman and the entire approach on which the draft was based, resulting in the collapse of the negotiation process. To justify its decision, the United States asserted that the protocol would not have improved BWC compliance and would have harmed U.S. national security and commercial interests. Many analysts, including Matthew Meselson and Amy Smithson, criticized the U.S. decision as undermining international efforts against non-proliferation and as contradicting U.S. government rhetoric regarding the alleged biological weapons threat posed by Iraq and other U.S. adversaries.

In subsequent years, calls for restarting negotiations on a verification protocol have been repeatedly voiced. For instance, during the 2019 Meeting of Experts "several States Parties stressed the urgency of resuming multilateral negotiations aimed at concluding a non-discriminatory, legally-binding instrument dealing with (...) verification measures". However, since "some States Parties did not support the negotiation of a protocol to the BWC" it seems "neither realistic nor practicable to return to negotiations". Notably, the Biden administration seems to reconsider the U.S. position on verification, as demonstrated by U.S. ambassador Bonnie Jenkins calling on the 2021 BWC Meeting of States Parties to "establish a new expert working group to examine possible measures to strengthen implementation of the Convention, increase transparency, and enhance assurance of compliance".

In December 2022, States Parties decided to establish a Working Group on strengthening the Convention, which aims to address among other issues, measures on verification and compliance.

=== Accusations of non-compliance ===
A number of BWC States Parties have been accused of breaching the convention's obligations by developing or producing biological weapons. Because of the intense secrecy around biological weapons programs, it is challenging to assess the actual scope of biological activities and whether they are legitimate defensive programs or a violation of the Convention—except for a few cases with an abundance of evidence for offensive development of biological weapons.

==== Soviet Union and Russia ====
Despite being a party and depositary to the BWC, the Soviet Union has operated the world's largest, longest, and most sophisticated biological weapons program, which goes back to the 1920s under the Red Army. Around the time when the BWC negotiations were finalized, and the treaty was signed in the early 1970s, the Soviet Union significantly expanded its covert biological weapons program under the oversight of the "civilian" institution Biopreparat within the Soviet Ministry of Health. The Soviet program employed up to 65,000 people in several hundred facilities and successfully weaponized several pathogens, such as those responsible for smallpox, tularemia, bubonic plague, influenza, anthrax, glanders, and Marburg fever.

The Soviet Union first drew much suspicion of violating its obligations under the BWC after an unusual anthrax outbreak in 1979 in the Soviet city of Sverdlovsk (formerly, and now again, Yekaterinburg) resulted in the deaths of approximately 65 to 100 people. The Soviet authorities blamed the outbreak on the consumption of contaminated meat and for years denied any connection between the incident and biological weapons research. However, investigations concluded that the outbreak was caused by an accident at a nearby military microbiology facility, resulting in the escape of an aerosol of anthrax pathogen. Supporting this finding, Russian president Boris Yeltsin later admitted that "our military developments were the cause".

Western concerns about Soviet compliance with the BWC increased during the late 1980s and were supported by information provided by several defectors, including Vladimir Pasechnik and Ken Alibek. American president George H. W. Bush and British prime minister Margaret Thatcher therefore directly challenged President Gorbachev with the information. After the Soviet Union's dissolution, the United Kingdom, the United States, and Russia concluded the Trilateral Agreement on 14 September 1992, reaffirming their commitment to full compliance with the BWC and declaring that Russia had eliminated its inherited offensive biological weapons program. The agreement's objective was to uncover details about the Soviet's biological weapons program and to verify that all related activities had truly been terminated.

David Kelly, a British expert on biological warfare and participant in the visits arranged under the Trilateral Agreement, concluded that, on the one hand, the agreement "was a significant achievement" in that it "provided evidence of Soviet non-compliance from 1975 to 1991"; on the other hand, Kelly noted that the Trilateral Agreement "failed dramatically" because Russia did not "acknowledge and fully account for either the former Soviet programme or the biological weapons activities that it had inherited and continued to engage in".

Milton Leitenberg and Raymond Zilinskas, authors of the 2012 book The Soviet Biological Weapons Program: A History, assert that Russia may still continue parts of the Soviet biological weapons program today. Similarly, as of 2021, the U.S. Department of State "assesses that the Russian Federation (Russia) maintains an offensive [biological weapons] program and is in violation of its obligation under Articles I and II of the BWC. The issue of compliance by Russia with the BWC has been of concern for many years".

In February 2026, scientists at Porton Down discovered epibatidine in tissue samples taken from Alexei Navalny's body, and a joint statement was made by the foreign ministers of Britain, France, Germany, the Netherlands and Sweden that ″Moscow had the means, motive and opportunity to administer this poison to him″. British toxicology expert Alastair Hay said that if Russia was behind the poisoning, it would have broken the BWC treaty, as well as the Chemical Weapons Convention, which prohibits the use of such weapons.

==== Iraq ====
Starting around 1985 under Saddam Hussein's leadership, Iraq weaponized anthrax, botulinum toxin, aflatoxin, and other agents, and created delivery vehicles, including bombs, missile warheads, aerosol generators, and spray systems. Although this program would have breached the provisions of the BWC, which Iraq had signed in 1972, Iraq only ratified the Convention in 1991 as a condition of the cease-fire agreement that ended the 1991 Gulf War. The Iraqi biological weapons program—along with its chemical weapons program—was uncovered after the Gulf War through the investigations of the United Nations Special Commission (UNSCOM), which was responsible for disarmament in post-war Iraq. Iraq deliberately obstructed, delayed, and deceived the UNSCOM investigations and only admitted to having operated an offensive biological weapons program under significant pressure in 1995. While Iraq maintained that it ended its biological weapons program in 1991, many analysts believe that the country violated its BWC obligations by continuing the program until at least 1996.

==== United States ====
In April 1997, Cuba invoked the provisions of Article V to request a formal consultative meeting to consider its allegations that the United States introduced the crop-eating insect Thrips palmi to Cuba via crop-spraying planes in October 1996. Cuba and the United States presented evidence for their diverging views on the incident in a formal consultation in August 1997. Having reviewed the evidence, twelve States Parties submitted reports, of which nine concluded that the evidence did not support the Cuban allegations, and two (China and Vietnam) maintained it was inconclusive.

On 4 September 2001, in the weeks prior to the September 11 attacks and 2001 anthrax attacks, the New York Times published an article outlining three US Department of Defense or Intelligence Community biological weapons programs, Project Bacchus, Project Clear Vision, and Project Jefferson, which focused on both anthrax and technology from the Soviet biological weapons program. While the Bush administration argued all three projects were defensive and in compliance with the BWC, several international law scholars argued the BWC was violated on two grounds. The first ground was the exclusion of these classified projects from the US BWC confidence-building measure declarations. The second was that the aim of Clear Vision was to construct a functional biological agent-containing cluster munition, and that the BWC's ban on biological weapons munitions and delivery vehicles is absolute, not allowing for their construction under the cover of defensive research.

A 2003 article published in Politics and the Life Sciences raised concerns about the compliance of the United States. Milton Leitenberg, James F. Leonard, and Richard Spertzel wrote that aspects of the U.S. biodefense program—particularly research conducted at the National Biodefense Analysis and Countermeasures Center—could be perceived as violating the BWC. The authors said that research on genetically modified pathogens, pathogen dispersal modeling, and "Red Teaming" activities, which simulate biothreat scenarios, resembled elements of past offensive biological weapons programs. The report questioned whether these activities, though carried out under the guise of defense, risked undermining the treaty’s prohibitions.

===== By Russia =====
In recent years, Russia has repeatedly alleged that the United States is supporting and operating biological weapons facilities in the Caucasus and Central Asia, in particular the Richard Lugar Center for Public Health Research in the Republic of Georgia. The U.S. Department of State called these allegations "groundless" and reaffirmed that "all U.S. activities (...) [were] consistent with the obligations set forth in the Biological Weapons Convention". Biological weapons expert Filippa Lentzos agreed that the Russian allegations are "unfounded" and commented that they are "part of a disinformation campaign". Similarly, Swedish biodefense specialists Roger Roffey and Anna-Karin Tunemalm called the allegations "a Russian propaganda tool".

During the Russian invasion of Ukraine, the Russian Federation convened a Formal Consultative Meeting under Article V of the Convention to address outstanding questions concerning the operation of biological laboratories in Ukraine by the United States. The meeting did not reach a consensus.

==== By United States ====
At the Fifth BWC Review Conference in 2001, the United States charged four BWC States Parties—Iran, Iraq, Libya, and North Korea—and one signatory, Syria, with operating covert biological weapons programs. Moreover, a 2019 report from the U.S. Department of State raises concerns regarding BWC compliance in China, Russia, North Korea, and Iran. The report concluded that North Korea "has an offensive biological weapons program and is in violation of its obligations under Articles I and II of the BWC" and that Iran "has not abandoned its (...) development of biological agents and toxins for offensive purposes".

== Implementation Support Unit ==
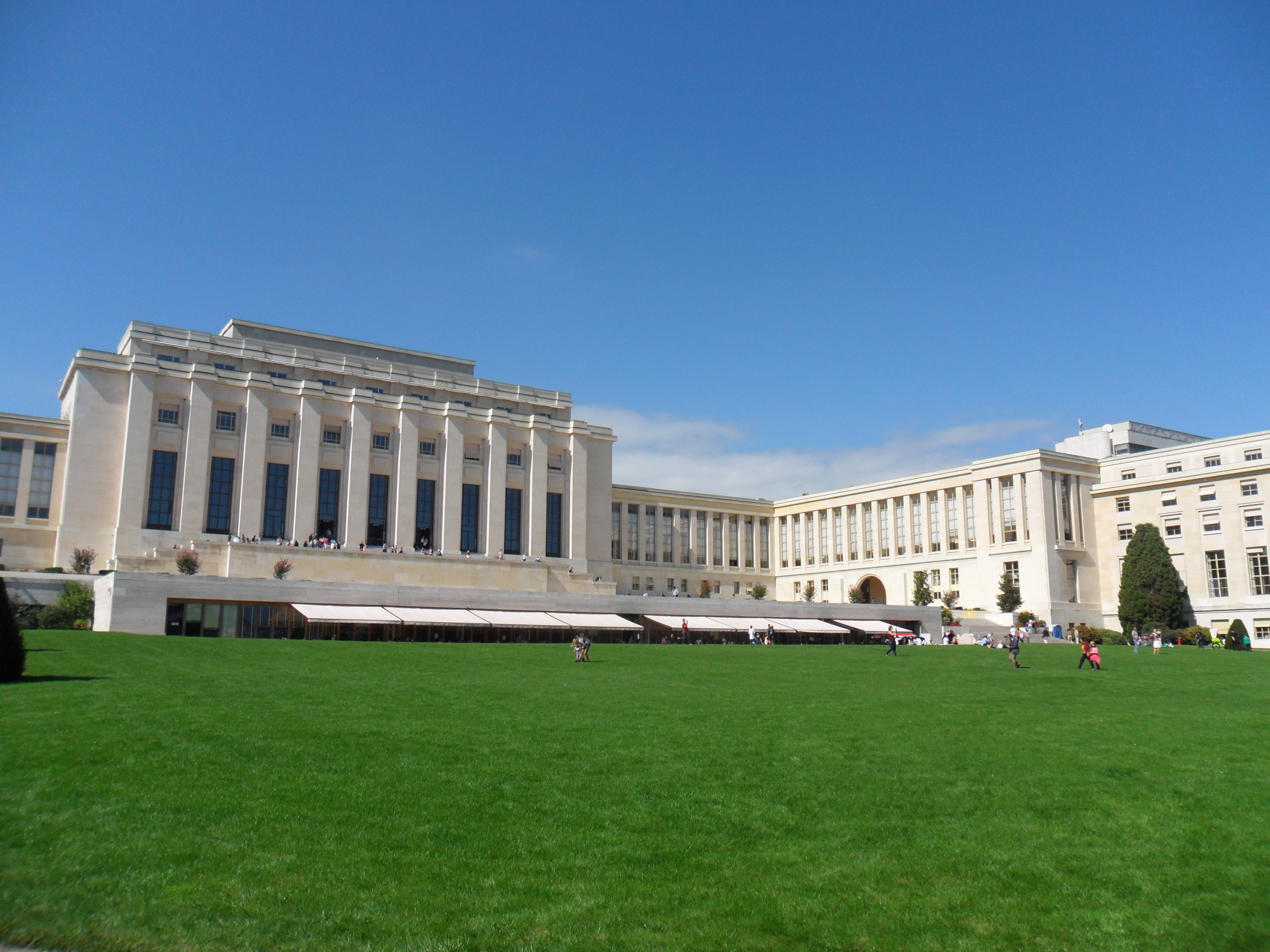
The Palace of Nations in Geneva, which houses the BWC ISU

After a decade of negotiations, the major effort to institutionally strengthen the BWC failed in 2001, which would have resulted in a legally binding protocol to establish an Organization for the Prohibition of Biological Weapons (OPBW). Against this background, the Sixth Review Conference in 2006 created an Implementation Support Unit (ISU) funded by the States Parties to the BWC and housed in the Geneva Branch of the United Nations Office for Disarmament Affairs. The unit's mandate is to provide administrative support, assist the national implementation of the BWC, encourage the treaty's universal adoption, pair assistance requests and offers, and oversee the confidence-building measures process.

The ISU was initially composed of three full-time staff with a budget smaller than the average McDonald's restaurant, and does not compare with the institutions established to deal with chemical or nuclear weapons. For example, the Organisation for the Prohibition of Chemical Weapons (OPCW) has about 500 employees, the International Atomic Energy Agency employs around 2,600 people, and the CTBTO Preparatory Commission employs around 280 staff. In December 2022, as a result of the Ninth Review Conference, States Parties decided to establish one new full-time staff position within the ISU, only for the period from 2023 to 2027.

== Review Conferences ==
States Parties have formally reviewed the operation of the BWC at periodic Review Conferences held every five years; the first took place in 1980. The objective of these conferences is to ensure the effective realization of the convention's goals and, in accordance with Article XII, to "take into account any new scientific and technological developments relevant to the Convention". Most Review Conferences have adopted additional understandings or agreements that have interpreted or elaborated the meaning, scope, and implementation of BWC provisions. These additional understandings are contained in the final documents of the Review Conferences and in an overview document prepared by the BWC Implementation Support Unit for the Eighth Review Conference in 2016. Due to the COVID-19 pandemic, the Ninth Review Conference originally scheduled for 2021 was postponed to 2022.

Review Conference	Date	Key outcomes and issues	BWC States Parties	Chairperson	Final Document
First	3. – 21. March 1980	1. Encouragement of voluntary declarations of (i) past possession of BWC-relevant items, (ii) efforts to destroy or divert these items to peaceful purposes, (iii) and enactment of national legislation to implement the convention.; 2. Elaboration of the cooperation under Article X by including personnel training, information exchange, and the transfer of materials and equipment.	87	Ambassador Oscar Vaerno (Norway)	BWC/CONF.I/10
Second	8. – 26. September 1986	1. Agreement on the annual exchange of confidence-building measures (CBMs), including information on (i) high-containment research laboratories, (ii) abnormal infectious disease outbreaks, and (iii) the encouragement of BWC-relevant research in publicly available journals.; 2. Bringing bioterrorism within the convention's scope by agreeing that it applies to all international, national and non-State actors and that it covers all relevant current and future scientific and technological developments.; 3. Strengthening of Article V by agreeing on the Formal Consultative Process, a procedure to resolve doubts about compliance through consultative meetings.; 4. Agreement that the World Health Organization would coordinate the emergency response in the event of suspected biological and toxin weapons use.	103	Ambassador Winfried Lang (Austria)	BWC/CONF.II/13
Third	9. – 27. September 1991	1. Expansion of the CBMs by including information on (i) national implementation measures such as legislation, (ii) past offensive and defensive biological weapons programs, and (iii) vaccine production facilities.; 2. Establishment of an expert group on verification, VEREX, mandated to identify and examine potential verification measures from a scientific and technical standpoint.; 3. Clarification that investigations under Article VI can also be requested through the Secretary-General and not only through the Security Council.; 4. Reaffirmation that the BWC covers not just agents affecting humans but also those affecting animals and plants.; 5. Clarification of the coordinating role of intergovernmental organizations responding to attacks allegedly involving biological weapons.; 6. Assertion that information on the implementation of Article X on peaceful uses of the biological sciences should also be provided to the United Nations.	116	Ambassador Roberto Garcia Moritan (Argentina)	BWC/CONF.III/23
Fourth	25. November – 6. December 1996	1. Reaffirmation that the use of biological weapons is considered prohibited under Article I.; 2. Assertion that the destruction and conversion of former biological weapons and associated facilities should be completed before accession to the BWC.; 3. Recommendation of specific measures to improve the implementation of Article X on peaceful uses of the biological sciences.	135	Ambassador Sir Michael Weston (U.K.)	BWC/CONF.IV/9
Fifth	19. November – 7. December 2001; 11. – 22. November 2002	1. Suspension of the conference by one year in response to the U.S. proposal to terminate the Ad Hoc Group's mandate.; 2. Establishment of an intersessional program, including annual Meetings of States Parties and Meetings of Experts, to promote discussion and agreement on a variety of topics relevant to the BWC.	144	Ambassador Tibor Toth (Hungary)	BWC/CONF.V/17
Sixth	20. November – 8. December 2006	1. Establishment of the BWC Implementation Support Unit within the United Nations Office for Disarmament Affairs in Geneva to provide administrative support and strengthen the Convention in other ways.; 2. Renewal and modification of the intersessional program.	155	Ambassador Masood Khan (Pakistan)	BWC/CONF.VI/6
Seventh	5. – 22. December 2011	1. Revision of the CBM reporting forms, including the deletion of CBM form D on the active promotion of contacts.; 2. Establishment of a database to facilitate assistance and cooperation under Article X.; 3. Establishment of a sponsorship program to support developing States Parties to participate in the annual BWC meetings.; 4. Reform of the convention's financing system.	165	Ambassador Paul van den IJssel (Netherlands)	BWC/CONF.VII/7
Eighth	7. – 25. November 2016	1. Renewal of the ISU's mandate, the sponsorship program, the intersessional program, and the Article X assistance and cooperation database.	177	Ambassador György Molnar (Hungary)	BWC/CONF.VIII/4
Ninth	28. November – 16. December 2022	1. Establishment of a Working Group to identify, examine and develop specific and effective measures, including possible legally-binding measures, and to make recommendations to strengthen and institutionalise the Convention in all its aspects.; 2. Decision to develop with a view to establishing two mechanisms, one on international cooperation and assistance under article X, and the other on the review of scientific and technological developments relevant to the Convention.; 3. Renewal of the ISU's mandate and the sponsorship program.; 4. Progress of the implementation of decisions and recommendations agreed upon at the Eighth Review Conference.	184	Ambassador Leonardo Bencini (Italy)	BWC/CONF.IX/9
Tenth	No later than 2027	1. New scientific and technological developments relevant to the Convention; 2. The progress made by States Parties on the implementation of the Convention; and; 3. Progress of the implementation of decisions and recommendations agreed upon at the Ninth Review Conference, taking into account, as appropriate, decisions and recommendations reached at previous Review Conferences.	185	TBD	None

== Intersessional program ==
As agreed at the Fifth Review Conference in 2001/2002, annual BWC meetings have been held between Review Conferences starting in 2003, referred to as the intersessional program. The intersessional program includes both annual Meetings of States Parties (MSP)—aiming to discuss, and promote common understanding and effective action on the topics identified by the Review Conference—as well as Meetings of Experts (MX), which serve as preparation for the Meeting of States Parties. The annual meetings do not have the mandate to adopt decisions, a privilege reserved for the Review Conferences which consider the results from the intersessional program.

Intersessional program period	Duration	Topics
2003 – 2005	MSP: 1 week MX: 2 weeks	1. the adoption of necessary national measures to implement the prohibitions set forth in the convention, including the enactment of penal legislation; 2. national mechanisms to establish and maintain the security and oversight of pathogenic microorganisms and toxins; 3. enhancing international capabilities for responding to, investigating and mitigating the effects of cases of alleged use of biological or toxin weapons or suspicious outbreaks of disease; 4. strengthening and broadening national and international institutional efforts and existing mechanisms for the surveillance, detection, diagnosis and combating of infectious diseases affecting humans, animals, and plants; 5. the content, promulgation, and adoption of codes of conduct for scientists
2007 – 2010	MSP: 1 week MX: 1 week	1. Ways and means to enhance national implementation, including enforcement of national legislation, strengthening of national institutions and coordination among national law enforcement institutions; 2. Regional and sub-regional cooperation on implementation of the Convention; 3. National, regional and international measures to improve biosafety and biosecurity, including laboratory safety and security of pathogens and toxins; 4. Oversight, education, awareness-raising, and adoption and/or development of codes of conduct with the aim of preventing misuse in the context of advances in bio-science and biotechnology research with the potential of use for purposes prohibited by the Convention; 5. With a view to enhancing international cooperation, assistance and exchange in biological sciences and technology for peaceful purposes, promoting capacity building in the fields of disease surveillance, detection, diagnosis, and containment of infectious diseases: (1) for States Parties in need of assistance, identifying requirements and requests for capacity enhancement; and (2) from States Parties in a position to do so, and international organizations, opportunities for providing assistance related to these fields; 6. Provision of assistance and coordination with relevant organizations upon request by any State Party in the case of alleged use of biological or toxin weapons, including improving national capabilities for disease surveillance, detection and diagnosis and public health systems
2012 – 2015	MSP: 1 week MX: 1 week	1. Cooperation and assistance, with a particular focus on strengthening cooperation and assistance under Article X; 2. Review of developments in the field of science and technology related to the Convention; 3. Strengthening national implementation; 4. How to enable fuller participation in the CBMs; 5. How to strengthen implementation of Article VII, including consideration of detailed procedures and mechanisms for the provision of assistance and cooperation by States Parties
2018 – 2020	MSP: 4 days MX: 5 separate meetings across 8 days	1. Cooperation and assistance, with a particular focus on strengthening cooperation and assistance under Article X; 2. Review of developments in the field of science and technology related to the Convention; 3. Strengthening national implementation; 4. Assistance, response and preparedness; 5. Institutional strengthening of the Convention
2023 - 2026	MSP: 3 days WG: 15 days	1. Measures on international cooperation and assistance under Article X; 2. Measures on scientific and technological developments relevant to the Convention; 3. Measures on confidence-building and transparency; 4. Measures on compliance and verification; 5. Measures on national implementation of the Convention; 6. Measures on assistance, response and preparedness under Article VII; 7. Measures on organizational, institutional and financial arrangements

== Challenges ==
=== Potential misuse of rapid scientific and technological developments ===
Advances in science and technology are relevant to the BWC since they may affect the threat presented by biological weapons. The ongoing advances in synthetic biology and enabling technologies are eroding the technological barriers to acquiring and genetically enhancing dangerous pathogens and using them for hostile purposes. For example, a 2019 report by the Stockholm International Peace Research Institute finds that "advances in three specific emerging technologies—additive manufacturing (AM), artificial intelligence (AI) and robotics—could facilitate, each in their own way, the development or production of biological weapons and their delivery systems". Similarly, biological weapons expert Filippa Lentzos argues that the convergence of genomic technologies with "machine learning, automation, affective computing, and robotics (...) [will] create the possibility of novel biological weapons that target particular groups of people and even individuals". On the other hand, these scientific developments may improve pandemic preparedness by strengthening prevention and response measures.

=== Technological challenges in the verification of biological weapons ===
There are several reasons why biological weapons are especially difficult to verify. First, in contrast to chemical and nuclear weapons, even small initial quantities of biological agents can be used to quickly produce militarily significant amounts. Second, biotechnological equipment and even dangerous pathogens and toxins cannot be prohibited altogether since they also have legitimate peaceful or defensive purposes, including the development of vaccines and medical therapies. Third, it is possible to rapidly eliminate biological agents, which makes short-notice inspections less effective in determining whether a facility produces biological weapons. For these reasons, Filippa Lentzos notes that "it is not possible to verify the BWC with the same level of accuracy and reliability as the verification of nuclear treaties".

=== Financial health of the Convention ===
BWC intersessional program meetings have recently been impeded by late payments and non-payments of financial contributions. BWC States Parties agreed at the Meeting of States Parties in 2018, which was cut short due to funding shortfalls, on a package of remedial financial measures including the establishment of a Working Capital Fund. This fund is financed by voluntary contributions and provides short-term financing in order to ensure the continuity of approved programs and activities. At the Ninth Review Conference, States Parties welcomed the improvement of the financial situation following the measures endorsed by the 2018 Meeting of States Parties, confirmed their effectiveness and decided to review them at the Tenth Review Conference. Live information on the financial status of the BWC and other disarmament conventions is available publicly on the financial dashboard of the United Nations Office for Disarmament Affairs.

== See also ==
=== Biological weapons and warfare ===
- Australia Group of countries controlling exports to prevent the spread of biological and chemical weapons
- Biological weapons
- Biological warfare
- Biological terrorism
- Geneva Protocol, the first treaty to prohibit the use of biological and chemical weapons
- International pandemic treaty
- United Nations Security Council Resolution 1540, resolution to curb the proliferation of weapons of mass destruction, particularly to non-state actors

=== Treaties for other types of weapons of mass destruction ===
- Chemical Weapons Convention (CWC) (states parties)
- Nuclear Non-Proliferation Treaty (NPT) (states parties)
- Treaty on the Prohibition of Nuclear Weapons (TPNW) (states parties)
- Comprehensive Nuclear Test-Ban Treaty (CTBT) (states parties)
