= Germs: Biological Weapons and America's Secret War =

2001 book by Judith Miller

- Author: Judith Miller, Stephen Engelberg, William J. Broad
- Language: English
- Subject: Biological warfare
- Genre: Nonfiction
- Publisher: Simon & Schuster
- Publication date: October 2, 2001
- Publication place: United States
- Media type: Hardcover
- Pages: 382
- ISBN: 0-684-87158-0
- OCLC: 47182085
- Dewey Decimal: 358/.38/0973 21
- LC Class: UG447.8 .M54 2001

Germs: Biological Weapons and America's Secret War is a 2001 book written by New York Times journalists Judith Miller, Stephen Engelberg, and William Broad. It describes how humanity has dealt with biological weapons, and the dangers of bioterrorism. It was the 2001 New York Times #1 Non-Fiction Bestseller the weeks of October 28 and November 4.

== Overview ==
Germs, is a work of investigative journalism employing biographical and historical narrative to provide context. The three authors interviewed hundreds of scientists and senior U.S. officials, and reviewed recently declassified documents, and reports from the former Soviet Union's bioweapons laboratories.

== Summary ==
"Germs were always what I call the Caboose of the weapons of mass destruction train." (Judith Miller, November 18, 2001)

—

The book opens with an account of the 1984 salmonella poisonings in The Dalles, Oregon, caused by followers of Bhagwan Shree Rajneesh who sprayed salmonella onto salad bars. Other research shows how Moscow scientists created an untraceable germ that would induce the body to self-destruct, and reveals that the U.S. military planned for germ warfare on Cuba during the 1960s. Three classified U.S. biodefense projects are detailed: Project Bacchus, Project Clear Vision, and Project Jefferson. Germs concludes with an assessment of the United States' ability to deter future bio-attack.

== Reviews ==
The New York Times Book Review was favorable, though it criticized the book's tone as "somewhat alarmist". BusinessWeek was also generally favorable, except for pointing out some conflicting views on bioterrorism. The Guardian's book review by British psychiatrist Simon Wessely, cautioned against panic, stating that biological weapons can cause destruction through fear, effectively giving the biodefense industry "the equivalent of a blank cheque".

== Adaptations ==
On November 13, 2001, the science TV series Nova aired an episode entitled Bioterror. Two years in the making, it chronicled Miller, Engelberg, and Broad's research and investigation into biological weapons.
