= General-purpose criterion =

Principle in disarmament law

The general-purpose criterion is an important concept in international law that broadly governs international agreements with respect to, for instance biological and chemical weapons. Although the term is not found within such agreements, it is "regularly used" to describe the comprehensive nature of prohibitions regarding all biological and chemical weapons.

== Scope ==
The scope of the general-purpose criterion broadly governs the purpose of biological and chemical agents as opposed to specific objects. The prohibitions under the criterion are thus not limited to a specific list, but encompass all biological and chemical weapons. It ensures that these prohibitions remain relevant regardless of future scientific and technological developments, and that they cover even currently unknown agents and toxins that may be employed as weapons.

== Example from the Biological Weapons Convention ==
The 1975 Biological Weapons Convention (BWC) incorporates the general-purpose criterion in its Article I (highlighted for emphasis), which states that: "Each State Party to this Convention undertakes never in any circumstances to develop, produce, stockpile or otherwise acquire or retain: (1) microbial or other biological agents, or toxins whatever their origin or method of production, of types and in quantities that have no justification for prophylactic, protective or other peaceful purposes."

Therefore, Article I applies to all scientific and technological developments whose intended use is inconsistent with the objectives of the BWC. It thus covers developments in all of the life sciences and other scientific fields of relevance to the BWC, including fields such as microbiology, genetic engineering, biotechnology, molecular biology and others.

== See also ==
- Chemical Weapons Convention
