= The Science of Yoga (book) =

The Science of Yoga: The Risks and the Rewards
- Author: William Broad
- Language: English
- Publication date: 2012

The Science of Yoga: The Risks and the Rewards is a 2012 non-fiction book by William Broad. It was generally well received by critics, who noted its somewhat discursive approach but its solid basis on research and interviews with scientists, historians and practitioners. Reviewers noted Broad's analysis of the possible risks of yoga practice, his debunking of some supposed benefits, and the reliable evidence for its actual benefits in terms of reducing anxiety, improving mood, and social interactions.

== Synopsis ==
Broad investigates the veracity of health claims associated with yoga as exercise, using scientific methods. Broad, who has practiced yoga since 1970, systematically examines assertions that yoga can prevent heart disease, reverse aging, alleviate pain, and enhance mental well-being.

The book reviews existing scientific literature, evaluating the quality and methodology of studies related to each claim. Broad identifies evidence supporting some benefits of yoga as exercise, such as reducing anxiety and improving mood, while noting areas where evidence is lacking, such as in weight loss. He also explores the potential of yoga to influence biological aging processes.

Broad examines the historical roots of yoga in ancient India. His research includes visits to libraries, interviews with historians, and examination of archival materials, revealing the diverse practices and beliefs associated with traditional yoga as a spiritual practice. This historical perspective contrasts with the modern perception of yoga as primarily a wellness activity in Western societies.

== Publication history ==
The Science of Yoga was published in hardback by Simon & Schuster in 2012. They brought out a paperback edition the same year.

== Reception ==
Annie Murphy Paul, in The New York Times, calls Broad's "open mind" unusual for this subject; she notes that he is an experienced science journalist for that newspaper, and a non-fiction book author. In her view, he steers a middle way between a devotee's enthusiasm and professional skepticism. The result is a "meandering" path but an "intellectually honest" one: yoga does not help people lose weight, but it does reduce anxiety, and so on for one claim after another. Broad goes in "dogged pursuit of the truth", speaking to "hundreds of scientists and [yoga] practitioners", reading many research papers, and travelling India to meet historians and to visit archives. He discovers the "vagabond" lifestyle of hatha yogis, utterly unlike the respectable clean modern western practice. Paul notes that many aspects of modern yoga as exercise were invented in the 20th century. She comments that the history is given in "intricate, perhaps excessive detail", but that the reader gradually "appreciate[s] Broad's conscientiousness" as he describes yoga's largely overlooked risk of causing injuries.

Connie Stewart, in Los Angeles Times, notes Broad's examples of injuries caused by yoga practice, such as damage to the sciatic nerves from long sitting in a forward bend (Paschimottanasana), or collapsing a lung from the forceful exhalations of Kapalabhati; in an extreme case, an accidental back-thrust to the neck while getting into wheel pose (Chakrasana) caused a stroke. Stewart comments that such accidents appear to be extremely rare, and can happen while doing any sort of exercise, even walking in the street. She notes that some plausible claims for yoga are false: it does not make you fit, and it actually lowers metabolism (except in its most energetic vinyasa forms). That lowering, Stewart notes, does contribute to improving mood. And (she writes) Broad presents good evidence that it benefits practitioners socially. She concludes that the book "can be enlightening for yogis and nonyogis alike."

Kirkus Reviews called The Science of Yoga "A fair, well-reasoned assessment of the many extraordinary claims made for yoga." It comments that Broad carefully analyses such claims, citing his statements to scientific and medical research papers. It remarks that Broad shows that yoga as exercise is not without risks, such as of nerve injury, but that it does indeed improve concentration, and can assist with creativity and mood. The review finds the book a "fascinating, persuasive case for demythologizing yoga and recognizing its true value to mind and body."

== Sources ==
- Broad, William (2012). The Science of Yoga: The Risks and the Rewards. Simon & Schuster. ISBN 978-1-4516-4142-4.
