= Verex =

VEREX was an ad hoc committee assembled in 1991 by the Third Review Conference of the Biological Weapons Convention (BWC) to research verification measures to enforce the BWC from a scientific and technical standpoint.

== Mandate and evaluation ==
VEREX was mandated to “identify and examine potential verification measures from a scientific and technical standpoint”. These verification measures sought to determine

Whether a State Party is developing, producing, stockpiling, acquiring or retaining microbial or other biological agents or toxins, of types and in quantities that have no justification for prophylactic, protective or other peaceful purposes.

The measures, which could be assessed singly or in combination, were to be evaluated against the following set of criteria:

- Their strengths and weaknesses based on, but not limited to the amount and quality of information they provide, and fail to provide;
- Their ability to differentiate between prohibited and permitted activities;
- Their ability to resolve ambiguities about compliance;
- Their technology, material, manpower and equipment requirements;
- Their financial, legal, safety and organisational implications;
- Their impact on scientific research, scientific co-operation, industrial development and other permitted activities, and their implications for the confidentiality of commercial proprietary information.

== Process ==
The VEREX committee, which consisted of governmental experts, met in a series of four sessions in 1992 and 1993.

The first session of the committee assembled 21 potential methods for verification, including surveillance, declaration of activities, and ways to inspect suspicious facilities. The second sessions focused on the uses and limitations of technologies that could be used to implement the methods discussed in the previous session. The third session examined the advantages and disadvantages of each of the 21 potential verification methods.

In September 1993, VEREX submitted its report, concluding that "some of the verification measures would contribute to strengthening the effectiveness and improve the implementation of the Convention". Moreover, the report states that these verification measures "could be useful to varying degrees in enhancing confidence, through increased transparency, that States Parties were fulfilling their obligations under the BWC".

== Verification measures under consideration ==
The following is a list of the 21 potential verifications measures that were identified and evaluated by VEREX:

1. surveillance of publications
2. surveillance of legislation
3. data on transfers, transfer requests and production
4. multilateral information sharing
5. exchange visits (off-site)
6. declarations
7. surveillance by satellite
8. surveillance by aircraft
9. ground-based surveillance (off-site)
10. sampling and identification (off-site)
11. observation (off-site)
12. auditing (off-site)
13. exchange visits – international arrangements
14. interviewing (on-site)
15. visual inspection (on-site)
16. identification of key equipment (on-site)
17. auditing (on-site)
18. sampling and identification (on-site)
19. medical examination (on-site)
20. continuous monitoring by instruments (on-site)
21. continuous monitoring by personnel (on-site)

== Subsequent failure to negotiate a BWC verification protocol ==
In 1994, a Special Conference of BWC States Parties convened to consider the VEREX report. The conference decided to establish an Ad Hoc Group to negotiate a legally-binding verification protocol for the BWC. The Ad Hoc Group convened 24 sessions between 1995 and 2001, during which it negotiated a draft protocol to the BWC which would establish a verification system supported by an international organization. This organization would regularly conduct on-site visits to declared biological facilities as well as investigate specific suspect facilities and activities. However, states disagreed on several fundamental issues, including the scope of on-site visits and export controls. By early 2001, the “rolling text” of the draft protocol still contained many areas on which views diverged widely.

A 210-page draft protocol, circulated in March 2001 by the chairman of the Ad Hoc Group, attempted to resolve the contested issues. However, in July 2001 the George W. Bush administration rejected both the draft protocol circulated by the Group's Chairman and the entire approach on which the draft was based, resulting in the collapse of the negotiation process. To justify its decision, the United States asserted that the protocol would not have improved BWC compliance and would have harmed U.S. national security and commercial interests. Many analysts, including Matthew Meselson and Amy Smithson, criticized the U.S. decision as undermining international efforts against non-proliferation and as contradicting U.S. government rhetoric regarding the alleged biological weapons threat posed by Iraq and other U.S. adversaries.

== See also ==
- Biological Weapons Convention
