= Day of Remembrance for All Victims of Chemical Warfare =

Annual commemorative event

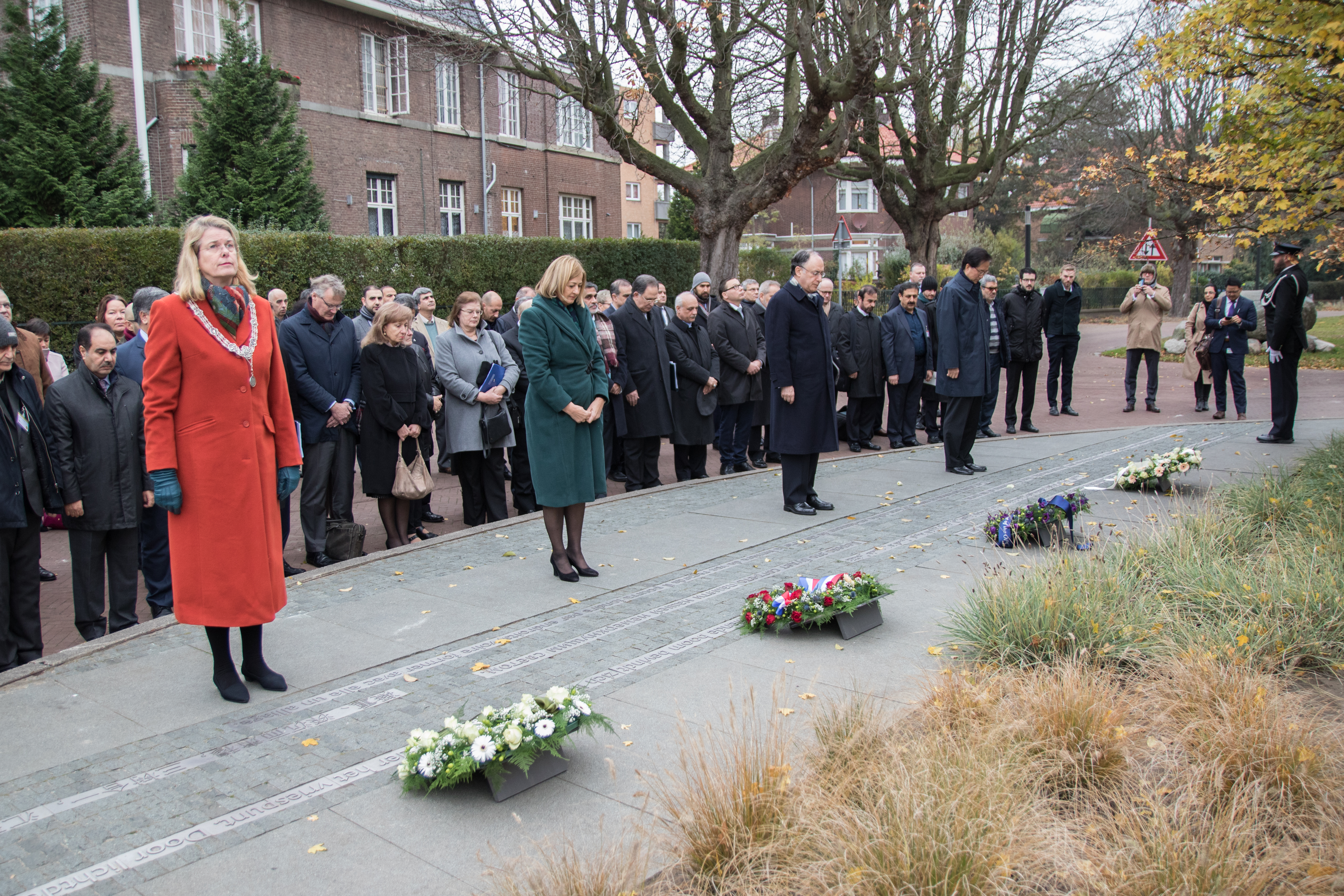
- Remembrance Day 2018
- Also called: Remembrance Day
- Observed by: All UN Member States
- Date: November 30
- Next time: 30 November 2026
- Frequency: annual
- Related to: Chemical Weapons Convention

The Day of Remembrance for All Victims of Chemical Warfare is an annual event held November 30 as a "tribute to the victims of chemical warfare, as well as to reaffirm the commitment of the Organisation for the Prohibition of Chemical Weapons (OPCW) to the elimination of the threat of chemical weapons, thereby promoting the goals of peace, security, and multilateralism." It is officially recognised by the United Nations (UN) and has been celebrated since 2005. On the 2013 observance day, the UN Secretary-General Ban Ki-moon gave a speech where he stated:

On this Remembrance Day, I urge the international community to intensify efforts to rid the world of chemical weapons, along with all other weapons of mass destruction. Let us work together to bring all States under the Convention and promote its full implementation. This is how we can best honour past victims and liberate future generations from the threat of chemical weapons.

== History ==
Participation in the Chemical Weapons Convention, which came into effect on April 29, 1997 Signed and ratified Acceded Signed but not ratified Non-signatory

On November 11, 2005, during the last day of the United Nations' Tenth Session of the Conference of the State Parties, the members of the UN officially recognised the Day of Remembrance for All Victims of Chemical Warfare, following a suggestion by Rogelio Pfirter, Director-General of the Secretariat. In addition, Pfirter's proposal to erect a monument at the Hague commemorating all victims of chemical warfare was approved. April 29 was chosen as the date for the event's celebration because the Chemical Weapons Convention entered into force on that day in 1997.

Although the majority of the world has either given up or destroyed their stockpiles of chemical weapons as of 2013, several nations have yet to do so. Four of these, Egypt, Israel, South Sudan and North Korea, have not ratified the convention and are suspected to possess chemical weapons. Syria is also known to possess a sizeable stockpile and Secretary-General Ban Ki-moon noted this in his 2013 speech, condemning the nation for its alleged exploitation of chemical weapons in its ongoing civil war. On September 14, 2013, the United States and Russia announced in Geneva that they reached a deal whereby Syria would ratify the treaty and give up its chemical weapons. The Syrian government has been cooperating and as of November 2013, all but one of Syria's 23 publicly declared chemical weapon sites have been visited by international inspectors that are dismantling the Syrian chemical weapons program.

At the 20th session of the Conference of the States Parties to the Chemical Weapons Convention in 2015, the date was changed to November 30 (or the first day of the regular session of the Conference, when appropriate). April 29 was designated "International Day for the Foundation of the Organisation for the Prohibition of Chemical Weapons" ("OPCW Day") instead.
