= Filippa Lentzos =

Norwegian social scientist

- Occupation: Senior Research Fellow at King’s College London

Academic background
- Education: PhD in Sociology, University of Nottingham

Academic work
- Discipline: Biosecurity
- Main interests: Biological disarmament and non-proliferation, biodefence, emerging technologies
- Website: filippalentzos.com

Filippa Lentzos is a Norwegian social scientist researching threats posed by biological agents. She is a senior research fellow at King's College London, holding a joint appointment in the Department of Global Health & Social Medicine and the Department of War Studies. Lentzos also holds the position of associate senior researcher at the Armament and Disarmament Programme at the Stockholm International Peace Research Institute (SIPRI). Moreover, she is the NGO Coordinator for the Biological Weapons Convention since 2017, the biosecurity columnist at the Bulletin of the Atomic Scientists since 2018, and an associate editor of the social science journal BioSocieties.

== Career ==
With a background in human sciences, Lentzos obtained a PhD in sociology from the University of Nottingham, England. She then spent 10 years as a researcher at the London School of Economics and Political Science (LSE) before joining the Department of Global Health & Social Medicine at King's College London in 2012. In 2017, she became cross-appointed to King’s Department of War Studies.

== Research and policy work ==
Lentzos' research focuses on the international governance of biological threats, especially in relation to the 1975 Biological Weapons Convention, an international treaty prohibiting the development, stockpiling, and use of biological weapons. She has published widely on biodefence, compliance assessment in the context of multilateral biological arms control efforts, and the governance of emerging life science technologies, such as synthetic biology and gene editing.

In her role as the NGO Coordinator for the Biological Weapons Convention, Lentzos has regularly delivered statements at the United Nations since 2017, in particular at the annual Meeting of States Parties, the Meeting of Experts and the First Committee of the UN General Assembly.

The work of Lentzos has been featured in various media outlets, including the BBC, The New Yorker, The Economist, The Telegraph, the Atlantic and Der Spiegel. In July 2021 Scientific American quoted her concerns that the same artificially created proteins utilized for modern experimental vaccines could easily end up being misused as bioweapons.

Lentzos also taught the module on biological weapons in the EU's Non-proliferation and Disarmament e-learning course.

== Selected publications ==
Books

- Lentzos, Filippa; Jefferson, Catherine; Marris, Claire; Rose, Nikolas. Synthetic Biology & Bioweapons. forthcoming: World Scientific. Archived from the original on 23 October 2020.
- Lentzos, Filippa (2016). Biological Threats in the 21st Century. Imperial College Press. doi:10.1142/p1081. ISBN 978-1-78326-947-1.

Journal articles

- Lentzos, Filippa; Wilson, James; Goodman, Michael (2020). "Health security intelligence: engaging across disciplines and sectors". Intelligence and National Security. 34 (4): 465–476. doi:10.1080/02684527.2020.1750166. S2CID 219090796.
- Lentzos, Filippa; Bruner, Robert C. (2018). "Militarising the Mind: Assessing the Weapons of the Ultimate Battlefield". BioSocieties. 14: 94–122. doi:10.1057/s41292-018-0121-4. S2CID 149786572.
- Lentzos, Filippa; Impelluso, Giulia (2017). "The Threat of Synthetic Smallpox: European Perspectives". Health Security. 15 (6): 582–586. doi:10.1089/hs.2017.0045. PMID 29178813.
