= Project Bacchus =

Covert investigation by a U.S. government agency

Project Bacchus was a covert investigation by the Defense Threat Reduction Agency to determine whether it is possible to construct a bioweapons production facility with off-the-shelf equipment.

== History ==
=== The project ===
Project Bacchus operated from 1999 to 2000 to investigate whether would-be terrorists could build an anthrax production facility and remain undetected. During the two-year simulation, the facility was constructed, and successfully produced an anthrax-like bacterium. The participating scientists were able to make about 1 kilogram (2.2 lb) of highly refined bacterial particles.

=== Reportage ===
The secret Project Bacchus was disclosed in a September 2001 article in The New York Times. Reporters Judith Miller, Stephen Engelberg and William J. Broad collaborated on the article. Shortly after it appeared, they published a book containing further details. The book, Germs: Biological Weapons and America's Secret War, and the article are the only publicly available sources concerning Project Bacchus and its sister projects, Clear Vision and Jefferson.
