= Chemical Weapons Convention =

Arms control treaty

Convention on the Prohibition of the Development, Production, Stockpiling and Use of Chemical Weapons and on their Destruction
Participation in the Chemical Weapons Convention
Signed and ratified
Acceded
Signed but not ratified
Non-signatory
- Drafted: 3 September 1992
- Signed: 13 January 1993
- Location: Paris and New York
- Effective: 29 April 1997
- Condition: Ratification by 65 states
- Signatories: 165
- Parties: 193 (List of state parties); Four UN states are not party: Egypt, Israel, North Korea and South Sudan.
- Depositary: UN Secretary-General
- Languages: Arabic, Chinese, English, French, Russian and Spanish

The Chemical Weapons Convention (CWC), officially the Convention on the Prohibition of the Development, Production, Stockpiling and Use of Chemical Weapons and on their Destruction, is an arms control treaty administered by the Organisation for the Prohibition of Chemical Weapons (OPCW), an intergovernmental organization based in The Hague, Netherlands. The treaty entered into force on 29 April 1997. It prohibits the use of chemical weapons, and the large-scale development, production, stockpiling, or transfer of chemical weapons or their precursors, except for very limited purposes (research, medical, pharmaceutical or protective). The main obligation of member states under the convention is to effect this prohibition, as well as the destruction of all current chemical weapons. All destruction activities must take place under OPCW verification.

As of August 2022, 193 states have become parties to the CWC and accept its obligations. Israel has signed but not ratified the agreement, while three other UN member states (Egypt, North Korea and South Sudan) have neither signed nor acceded to the treaty. Most recently, the State of Palestine deposited its instrument of accession to the CWC on 17 May 2018. In September 2013, Syria acceded to the convention as part of an agreement for the destruction of Syria's chemical weapons.

Under the convention, the entirety of the chemical weapons stockpiles declared by the States Parties to the convention have been irreversibly destroyed, an achievement reached in July 2023. The convention has provisions for systematic evaluation of chemical production facilities, as well as for investigations of allegations of use and production of chemical weapons based on the intelligence of other state parties.

Some chemicals which have been used extensively in warfare but have numerous large-scale industrial uses (such as phosgene) are highly regulated; however, certain notable exceptions exist. Chlorine gas is highly toxic, but being a pure element and widely used for peaceful purposes, is not officially listed as a chemical weapon. Certain state powers (e.g. the former Assad regime of Syria) continued to regularly manufacture and implement such chemicals in combat munitions. Although these chemicals are not specifically listed as controlled by the CWC, the use of any toxic chemical as a weapon (when used to produce fatalities solely or mainly through its toxic action) is in and of itself forbidden by the treaty. Other chemicals, such as white phosphorus, are highly toxic but are legal under the CWC when they are used by military forces for reasons other than their toxicity.

== History ==
The CWC augments the Geneva Protocol of 1925, which bans the use of chemical and biological weapons in international armed conflicts, but not their development or possession. The CWC also includes extensive verification measures such as on-site inspections, in stark contrast to the 1975 Biological Weapons Convention (BWC), which lacks a verification regime.

After several changes of name and composition, the ENDC evolved into the Conference on Disarmament (CD) in 1984. On 3 September 1992 the CD submitted to the U.N. General Assembly its annual report, which contained the text of the Chemical Weapons Convention. The General Assembly approved the convention on 30 November 1992, and the U.N. Secretary-General then opened the convention for signature in Paris on 13 January 1993. The CWC remained open for signature until its entry into force on 29 April 1997, 180 days after the deposit at the UN by Hungary of the 65th instrument of ratification.

== Organisation for the Prohibition of Chemical Weapons (OPCW) ==
Headquarters in The Hague

The convention is administered by the Organisation for the Prohibition of Chemical Weapons (OPCW), which acts as the legal platform for specification of the CWC provisions. The Conference of the States Parties is mandated to change the CWC and pass regulations on the implementation of CWC requirements. The Technical Secretariat of the organization conducts inspections to ensure compliance of member states. These inspections target destruction facilities (where constant monitoring takes place during destruction), chemical weapons production facilities which have been dismantled or converted for civil use, as well as inspections of the chemical industry. The Secretariat may furthermore conduct "investigations of alleged use" of chemical weapons and give assistance after use of chemical weapons.

The 2013 Nobel Peace Prize was awarded to the organization because it had, with the Chemical Weapons Convention, "defined the use of chemical weapons as a taboo under international law" according to Thorbjørn Jagland, Chairman of the Norwegian Nobel Committee.

== Key points of the Convention ==
- Prohibition of production and use of chemical weapons
- Destruction (or monitored conversion to other functions) of chemical weapons production facilities
- Destruction of all chemical weapons (including chemical weapons abandoned outside the state parties territory)
- Assistance between State Parties and the OPCW in the case of use of chemical weapons
- An OPCW inspection regime for the production of chemicals which might be converted to chemical weapons
- International cooperation in the peaceful use of chemistry in relevant areas

=== Controlled substances ===
The convention distinguishes three classes of controlled substance, chemicals that can either be used as weapons themselves or used in the manufacture of weapons. The classification is based on the quantities of the substance produced commercially for legitimate purposes. Each class is split into Part A, which are chemicals that can be used directly as weapons, and Part B, which are chemicals useful in the manufacture of chemical weapons. Separate from the precursors, the convention defines toxic chemicals as "[a]ny chemical which through its chemical action on life processes can cause death, temporary incapacitation or permanent harm to humans or animals. This includes all such chemicals, regardless of their origin or of their method of production, and regardless of whether they are produced in facilities, in munitions or elsewhere."

- Schedule 1 chemicals have few, or no uses outside chemical weapons. These may be produced or used for research, medical, pharmaceutical or chemical weapon defence testing purposes but production at sites producing more than 100 grams per year must be declared to the OPCW. A country is limited to possessing a maximum of 1 tonne of these materials. Examples are sulfur mustard and nerve agents, and substances which are solely used as precursor chemicals in their manufacture. A few of these chemicals have very small scale non-military applications, for example, milligram quantities of nitrogen mustard are used to treat certain cancers.
- Schedule 2 chemicals have legitimate small-scale applications. Manufacture must be declared and there are restrictions on export to countries that are not CWC signatories. An example is thiodiglycol which can be used in the manufacture of mustard agents, but is also used as a solvent in inks.
- Schedule 3 chemicals have large-scale uses apart from chemical weapons. Plants which manufacture more than 30 tonnes per year must be declared and can be inspected, and there are restrictions on export to countries which are not CWC signatories. Examples of these substances are phosgene (the most lethal chemical weapon employed in World War I), which has been used as a chemical weapon but which is also a precursor in the manufacture of many legitimate organic compounds (e.g. pharmaceutical agents and many common pesticides), and triethanolamine, used in the manufacture of nitrogen mustard but also commonly used in toiletries and detergents.

Many of the chemicals named in the schedules are simply examples from a wider class, defined with Markush like language. For example, all chemicals in the class "O-Alkyl (<=C10, incl. cycloalkyl) alkyl (Me, Et, n-Pr or i-Pr)- phosphonofluoridates chemicals" are controlled, despite only a few named examples being given, such as Soman.

This can make it more challenging for companies to identify if chemicals they handle are subject to the CWC, especially Schedule 2 and 3 chemicals (such as Alkylphosphorus chemicals). For example, Amgard 1045 is a flame retardant, but falls within Schedule 2B as part of Alkylphosphorus chemical class. This approach is also used in controlled drug legislation in many countries and are often termed "class wide controls" or "generic statements".

Due to the added complexity these statements bring in identifying regulated chemicals, many companies choose to carry out these assessments computationally, examining the chemicals structure using in silico tools which compare them to the legislation statements, either with in house systems maintained a company or by the use commercial compliance software solutions.

A treaty party may declare a "single small-scale facility" that produces up to 1 tonne of Schedule 1 chemicals for research, medical, pharmaceutical or protective purposes each year, and also another facility may produce 10 kg per year for protective testing purposes. An unlimited number of other facilities may produce Schedule 1 chemicals, subject to a total 10 kg annual limit, for research, medical or pharmaceutical purposes, but any facility producing more than 100 grams must be declared.

The treaty also deals with carbon compounds called in the treaty "discrete organic chemicals", the majority of which exhibit moderate-high direct toxicity or can be readily converted into compounds with toxicity sufficient for practical use as a chemical weapon. These are any carbon compounds apart from long chain polymers, oxides, sulfides and metal carbonates, such as organophosphates. The OPCW must be informed of, and can inspect, any plant producing (or expecting to produce) more than 200 tonnes per year, or 30 tonnes if the chemical contains phosphorus, sulfur or fluorine, unless the plant solely produces explosives or hydrocarbons.

=== Category definitions ===
Chemical weapons are divided into three categories:

- Category 1 - based on Schedule 1 substances
- Category 2 - based on non-Schedule 1 substances
- Category 3 - devices and equipment designed to use chemical weapons, without the substances themselves

== Member states ==
Before the CWC came into force in 1997, 165 states signed the convention, allowing them to ratify the agreement after obtaining domestic approval. Following the treaty's entry into force, it was closed for signature and the only method for non-signatory states to become a party was through accession. As of March 2021, 193 states, representing over 98 percent of the world's population, are party to the CWC. Of the four United Nations member states that are not parties to the treaty, Israel has signed but not ratified the treaty, while Egypt, North Korea, and South Sudan have neither signed nor acceded to the convention. Taiwan, though not a member state, has stated on 27 August 2002 that it fully complies with the treaty.

=== Key organizations of member states ===
Member states are represented at the OPCW by their Permanent Representative. This function is generally combined with the function of Ambassador. For the preparation of OPCW inspections and preparation of declarations, member states have to constitute a National Authority.

== World stockpile of chemical weapons ==
A total of 72,304 metric tonnes of chemical agent, and 97 production facilities have been declared to OPCW.

=== Treaty deadlines ===
The treaty set up several steps with deadlines toward complete destruction of chemical weapons, with a procedure for requesting deadline extensions. No country reached total elimination by the original treaty date although several finished under allowed extensions.

Reduction Phases
Phase	% Reduction	Deadline	Notes
I	1%	April 2000	
II	20%	April 2002	Complete destruction of empty munitions, precursor chemicals, filling equipment and weapons systems
III	45%	April 2004	
IV	100%	April 2007	No extensions permitted past April 2012

=== Progress of destruction ===
On 7 July 2023, the OPCW announced that all 72,304.34 metric tonnes of declared chemical agent had been verifiably destroyed.

Seven state parties have completed the destruction of their declared stockpiles: Albania, India, Iraq, Libya, Syria, the United States, and an unspecified state party (believed to be South Korea). Russia also completed the destruction of its declared stockpile. According to the US Arms Control Association, the poisoning of Sergei and Yulia Skripal in 2018 and the poisoning of Alexei Navalny in 2020 indicated that Russia maintained an illicit chemical weapons program.

Japan and China in October 2010 began the destruction of World War II era chemical weapons abandoned by Japan in China by means of mobile destruction units and reported destruction of 35,203 chemical weapons (75% of the Nanjing stockpile).

Country and link to detail article	Date of accession/ entry into force	Declared stockpile (Schedule 1) (tonnes)	% OPCW-verified destroyed (date of full destruction)	Destruction deadline
Albania	29 April 1997	17	100% (July 2007)	
South Korea	29 April 1997	3,000–3,500	100% (July 2008)	
India	29 April 1997	1,044	100% (March 2009)	
Libya	5 February 2004	25	100% (January 2014)	
Syria (government held)	14 October 2013	1,040	100% (August 2014)	
Russia	5 December 1997	40,000	100% (September 2017)	
United States	29 April 1997	33,600	100% (July 2023)	
Iraq	12 February 2009	remnant munitions	100% (March 2018)	
Japan (in China)	29 April 1997	-	66.97% (as of September 2022)	2027

==== Iraqi stockpile ====
The U.N. Security Council ordered the dismantling of Iraq's chemical weapon stockpile in 1991. By 1998, UNSCOM inspectors had accounted for the destruction of 88,000 filled and unfilled chemical munitions, over 690 metric tons of weaponized and bulk chemical agents, approximately 4,000 tonnes of precursor chemicals, and 980 pieces of key production equipment. The UNSCOM inspectors left in 1998.

In 2009, before Iraq joined the CWC, the OPCW reported that the United States military had destroyed almost 5,000 old chemical weapons in open-air detonations since 2004. These weapons, produced before the 1991 Gulf War, contained sarin and mustard agents but were so badly corroded that they could not have been used as originally intended.

When Iraq joined the CWC in 2009, it declared "two bunkers with filled and unfilled chemical weapons munitions, some precursors, as well as five former chemical weapons production facilities" according to OPCW Director General Rogelio Pfirter. The bunker entrances were sealed with 1.5 meters of reinforced concrete in 1994 under UNSCOM supervision. As of 2012, the plan to destroy the chemical weapons was still being developed, in the face of significant difficulties. In 2014, ISIS took control of the site.

On 13 March 2018, the Director-General of the Organisation for the Prohibition of Chemical Weapons (OPCW), Ambassador Ahmet Üzümcü, congratulated the Government of Iraq on the completion of the destruction of the country's chemical weapons remnants.

==== Syrian destruction ====
Following the August 2013 Ghouta chemical attack, Syria, which had long been suspected of possessing chemical weapons, acknowledged them in September 2013 and agreed to put them under international supervision. On 14 September Syria deposited its instrument of accession to the CWC with the United Nations as the depositary and agreed to its provisional application pending entry into force effective 14 October. An accelerated destruction schedule was devised by Russia and the United States on 14 September, and was endorsed by United Nations Security Council Resolution 2118 and the OPCW Executive Council Decision EC-M-33/DEC.1. Their deadline for destruction was the first half of 2014. Syria gave the OPCW an inventory of its chemical weapons arsenal and began its destruction in October 2013, 2 weeks before its formal entry into force, while applying the convention provisionally. All declared Category 1 materials were destroyed by August 2014. However, the Khan Shaykhun chemical attack in April 2017 indicated that undeclared stockpiles probably remained in the country. A chemical attack on Douma occurred on 7 April 2018 that killed at least 49 civilians with scores injured, and which has been blamed on the Assad government.

Controversy arose in November 2019 over the OPCW's finding on the Douma chemical weapons attack when Wikileaks published emails by an OPCW staff member saying a report on this incident "misrepresents the facts" and contains "unintended bias". The OPCW staff member questioned the report's finding that OPCW's inspectors had "sufficient evidence at this time to determine that chlorine, or another reactive chlorine-containing chemical, was likely released from cylinders". The staff member alleged this finding was "highly misleading and not supported by the facts" and said he would attach his own differing observations if this version of the report was released. On 25 November 2019, OPCW Director General Fernando Arias, in a speech to the OPCW's annual conference in The Hague, defended the Organization's report on the Douma incident, stating "While some of these diverse views continue to circulate in some public discussion forums, I would like to reiterate that I stand by the independent, professional conclusion" of the probe.

==== Financial support for destruction ====
Financial support for the Albanian and Libyan stockpile destruction programmes was provided by the United States. Russia received support from a number of countries, including the United States, the United Kingdom, Germany, the Netherlands, Italy and Canada; with some $2 billion given by 2004. Costs for Albania's program were approximately US$48 million. As of 2007, the United States had spent $20 billion and expected to spend a further $40 billion.

=== Known chemical weapons production facilities ===
Fourteen states parties declared chemical weapons production facilities (CWPFs):

- Bosnia and Herzegovina
- China
- France
- India
- Iran
- Iraq
- Japan
- Libya
- Russia
- Serbia
- Syria
- United Kingdom
- United States

- 1 non-disclosed state party (referred to as "A State Party" in OPCW-communications; said to be South Korea)

By 31 December 2023, all 97 declared production facilities had been deactivated and certified as either destroyed (74) or converted (23) to civilian use.

== Compliance and Alleged Violations ==
=== Sudan ===
Sudan officially acceded to the Chemical Weapons Convention (CWC) on 24 May 1999, becoming a State Party to the treaty that prohibits the development, production, acquisition, stockpiling, retention, transfer, or use of chemical weapons. By ratifying the CWC, Sudan legally committed to destroy any chemical weapons it possessed, declare chemical facilities as required, and allow verification inspections by the Organisation for the Prohibition of Chemical Weapons (OPCW)—the international body tasked with implementing the Convention. Accession to the CWC marked Sudan’s formal acceptance of international norms against chemical warfare and placed it under binding obligations to refrain from chemical weapons activities and to cooperate with other States Parties in enforcing the global ban.

An investigation by Amnesty International documented what it described as at least 30 suspected chemical weapons attacks against civilians between January and September 2016, estimating that up to 200–250 people, many of them children, may have died as a result of exposure to toxic agents. Survivors’ testimonies and expert analysis of imagery suggested the possible use of vesicants (blister agents) such as sulfur mustard or lewisite, substances categorically banned under the CWC when used as weapons. These findings were based on satellite imagery, more than 200 interviews with victims and witnesses, and independent expert interpretation, although Sudan denied the allegations and restricted access to the affected areas. The Organisation for the Prohibition of Chemical Weapons (OPCW) acknowledged receipt of the reports and indicated it would examine the information, but at the time had not publicly verified the claims.

Despite these commitments, credible reports from 2024–2025 indicate that Sudan’s armed forces may have violated the Convention’s core prohibitions by using chemical agents such as chlorine gas during the ongoing civil war. Investigations by media outlets and human rights organizations found evidence suggesting that the Sudanese army deployed barrels of chlorine near Khartoum and other locations, a use of chemical agents that is expressly banned under the CWC when intended as a weapon. Independent groups like Human Rights Watch and statements from U.S. officials concluded that such incidents, if confirmed, constitute a breach of Sudan’s international legal obligations and a serious violation of the global ban on chemical weapons, prompting sanctions from the United States.

=== Syria ===
Syria acceded to the Chemical Weapons Convention in 2013 following international pressure to dismantle its chemical weapons program. Subsequent investigations by the Organisation for the Prohibition of Chemical Weapons (OPCW) found that Syrian government forces were responsible for multiple chemical weapons attacks, including the use of sarin and chlorine. The OPCW’s Investigation and Identification Team attributed several incidents between 2017 and 2018 to the Syrian Arab Air Force.

Human Rights Watch and United Nations–mandated investigations concluded that Syrian government forces were responsible for the majority of confirmed chemical weapons attacks during the Syrian civil war. In response to Syria’s continued non-compliance, States Parties to the Convention voted in 2021 to suspend certain rights and privileges of Syria under the treaty, including voting rights at conferences of the Chemical Weapons Convention.

== See also ==
=== Related international law ===
- Australia Group of countries and the European Commission that helps member nations identify exports which need to be controlled so as not to contribute to the spread of chemical and biological weapons
- 1990 US-Soviet Arms Control Agreement
- General-purpose criterion, a concept in international law that broadly governs international agreements with respect to chemical weapons
- Geneva Protocol, a treaty prohibiting the use of chemical and biological weapons among signatory states in international armed conflicts

=== Worldwide treaties for other types of weapons of mass destruction ===
- Biological Weapons Convention (BWC) (states parties)
- Nuclear Non-Proliferation Treaty (NPT) (states parties)
- Treaty on the Prohibition of Nuclear Weapons (TPNW) (states parties)

=== Chemical weapons ===
- Chemical warfare
- Weapons of mass destruction
- Tear gas

=== Related remembrance day ===
- Day of Remembrance for all Victims of Chemical Warfare
