= James F. Leonard =

American diplomat (1920–2020)

James Fulton Leonard Jr. (May 30, 1920 – August 29, 2020) was an American diplomat who served as Foreign Service Officer and United States Ambassador to the United Nations (1977–1979). He was born in Osborne, Pennsylvania in May 1920. He served in the United States Army Corps of Engineers during World War II. He was a member of the American Academy of Diplomacy. He was educated at Princeton University (B.S. 1942), Harvard University (1952–53), and Columbia University (1963–64). He married Eleanor Martha Hanson, and they raised five daughters together, as well as a son from Eleanor's previous marriage. He died in August 2020 at the age of 100.
