= William Broad =

American science and technology writer

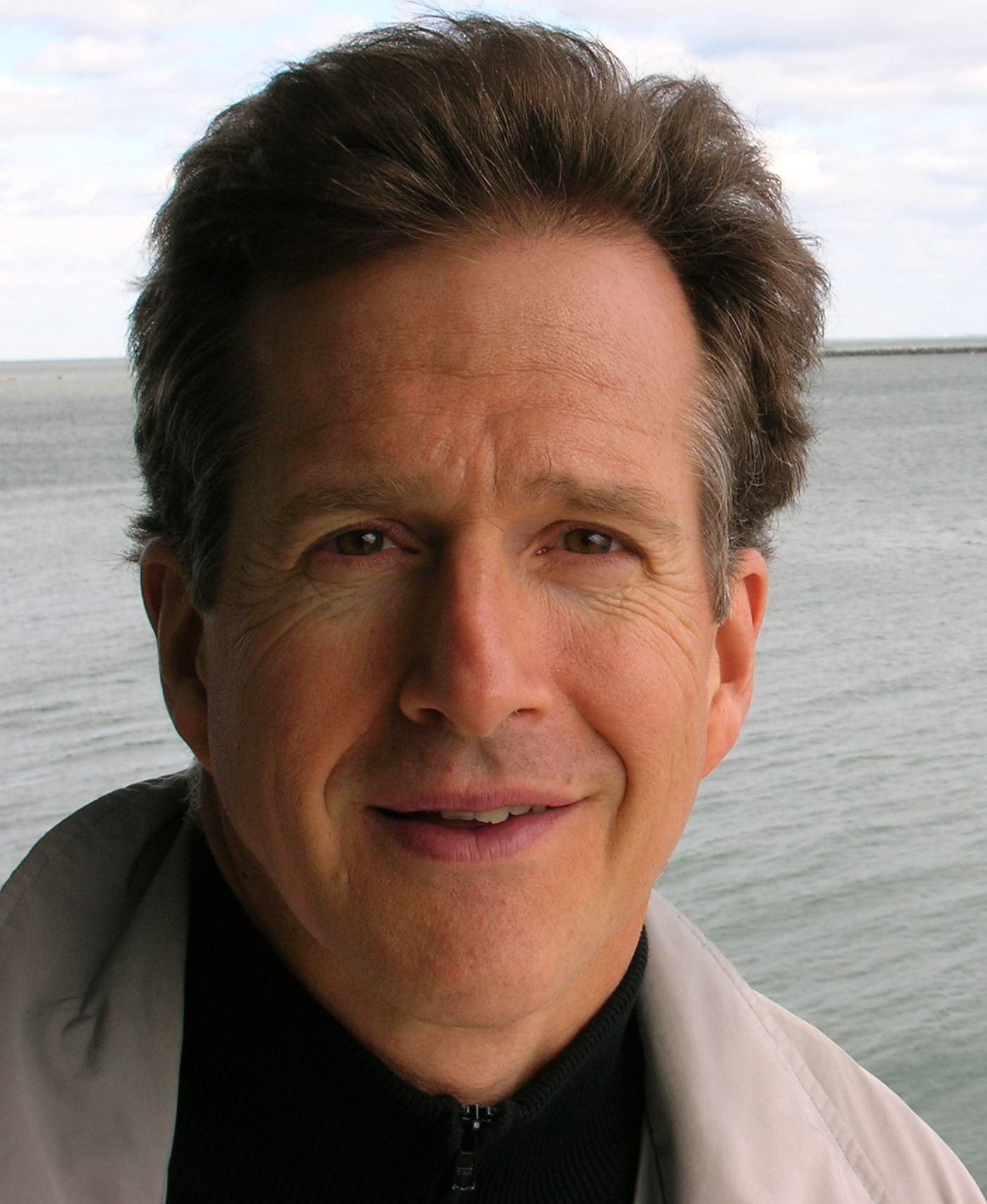
- William Broad in 2005
- Born: William J. Broad; March 7, 1951 (age 75)
- Education: University of Wisconsin
- Occupation: Science journalist
- Known for: Germs: Biological Weapons and America's Secret War; Betrayers of the Truth
- Awards: Pulitzer Prize; Alfred I. duPont–Columbia University Award; Emmy Award
- Website: www.nytimes.com/by/william-j-broad

William J. Broad (born March 7, 1951) is an American science journalist, author and a Senior Writer at The New York Times.

== Early life and education ==
Broad was born on March 7, 1951. He earned a master's degree from the University of Wisconsin in 1977.

== Career ==
Broad is the author or co-author of eight books, including Germs: Biological Weapons and America's Secret War (Simon & Schuster, 2001) which was a number-one New York Times Best Seller. His other titles include Betrayers of the Truth: Fraud and Deceit in the Halls of Science (co-written with Nicholas Wade, Simon & Schuster, 1982), Teller's War: The Top-Secret Story Behind the Star Wars Deception (Simon & Schuster, 1992), The Universe Below: Discovering the Secrets of the Deep Sea (Simon & Schuster, 1997), and The Science of Yoga: The Risks and the Rewards (Simon & Schuster, 2012). His books have been translated into more than a dozen languages. His work focuses on the social repercussions of science.

In 2009, he received criticism for an article on the sustainability of the blue grenadier fish from representatives of the New Zealand fishing industry.

== Awards ==
Broad has won two shared Pulitzer Prizes, an News and Documentary Emmy Award, and an Alfred I. duPont–Columbia University Award. The 1986 Pulitzer Prize for Explanatory Journalism recognized New York Times staff coverage of U.S. antimissile defense in space, or Star Wars: "a six-part comprehensive series on the Strategic Defense Initiative, which explored the scientific, political and foreign policy issues involved in 'Star Wars'." The 1987 Pulitzer Prize for National Reporting recognized New York Times staff coverage of the Space Shuttle Challenger disaster: "the aftermath of the Challenger explosion, which included stories that identified serious flaws in the shuttle's design and in the administration of America's space program." In 2002, the PBS Nova documentary Bioterror won a News and Documentary Emmy Award; it detailed the threat of bioterrorism and featured the work of Broad and his fellow co-authors of Germs. In 2005 he and New York Times colleague David E. Sanger were Pulitzer finalists in the Explanatory Reporting category for their aggressive reporting and lucid writing that cast light on the shadowy process of nuclear proliferation". In 2007, he shared a DuPont Award (with the New York Times team, Investigation Discovery and Canadian Broadcasting Corporation) from the Columbia University Graduate School of Journalism for the documentary, Nuclear Jihad: Can Terrorists Get the Bomb?

== Publications ==
- With Judith Miller and Stephen Engelberg, Germs: Biological Weapons and America's Secret War
- The Publishing Game: Getting More for Less (in the journal Science, 1981)
- With Nicholas Wade, Betrayers of the Truth: Fraud and Deceit in the Halls of Science. New York: Simon & Schuster, 1983. ISBN 0-671-49549-6.
- Star Warriors: A Penetrating Look into the Lives of the Young Scientists Behind Our Space Age Weaponry, Simon & Schuster (1985) ISBN 0-671-54566-3.
- Teller's War: The Top-Secret Story Behind the Star Wars Deception, Simon & Schuster (1992) ISBN 0-671-70106-1.
- The Universe Below (1997) New York: Simon & Schuster. ISBN 0-684-81108-1 Also ISBN 978-0-684-81108-6
- The Oracle: The Lost Secrets and Hidden Messages of Ancient Delphi (2006). New York: Penguin Press. ISBN 1-59420-081-5 Also ISBN 978-1-59420-081-6
- The Science of Yoga: The Risks and the Rewards (2012). New York: Simon & Schuster. ISBN 978-1-4516-4142-4
- "A Spy’s Path: Iowa to A-Bomb to Kremlin Honor", The New York Times (Nov. 12, 2007)

=== Reviews ===
Some of Broad's works are reviewed in:

- Scott, Julie (2006). "Review of 'The Oracle'" (PDF). The Rose+Croix Journal: 139–140. Archived from the original (PDF) on July 17, 2006.
- Schrank, Sarah (2014). "American Yoga: The Shaping of Modern Body Culture in the United States". American Studies. 53 (1): 169–182. doi:10.1353/ams.2014.0021. S2CID 144698814. Archived from the original on April 28, 2019.
