= List of international trips made by United States secretaries of state =

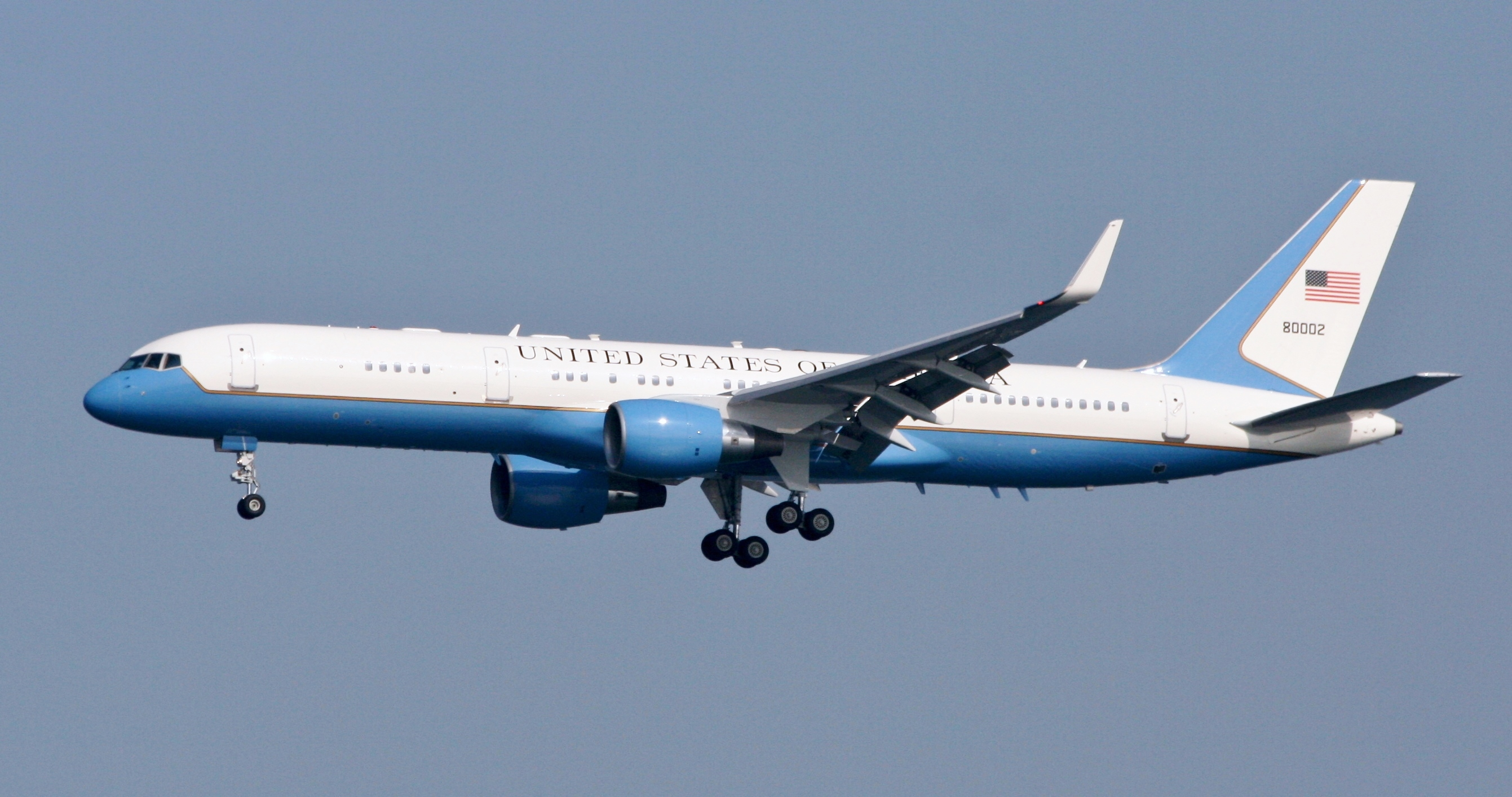
Air Force Three, the Boeing C-32, is the usual transportation for the United States Secretary of State, currently Marco Rubio

This is a list of international visits undertaken by United States secretaries of state. The list includes both private travel and official state visits. The list includes only foreign travel which the secretaries of state have made during their tenure in the position.

The first secretary of state who made a trip abroad was William H. Seward, who visited the Danish West Indies in 1866. In the early years, most secretary of state visits took place in the North, Central, and South American countries and in the Caribbean. John Hay was the first secretary of state to visit Europe. Philander C. Knox was the first to go to Asia. Cordell Hull was the first to go to Africa. Dean Rusk was the first to go to Oceania. John Kerry was the first to complete all 7 continents by visiting Antarctica.

== William H. Seward ==
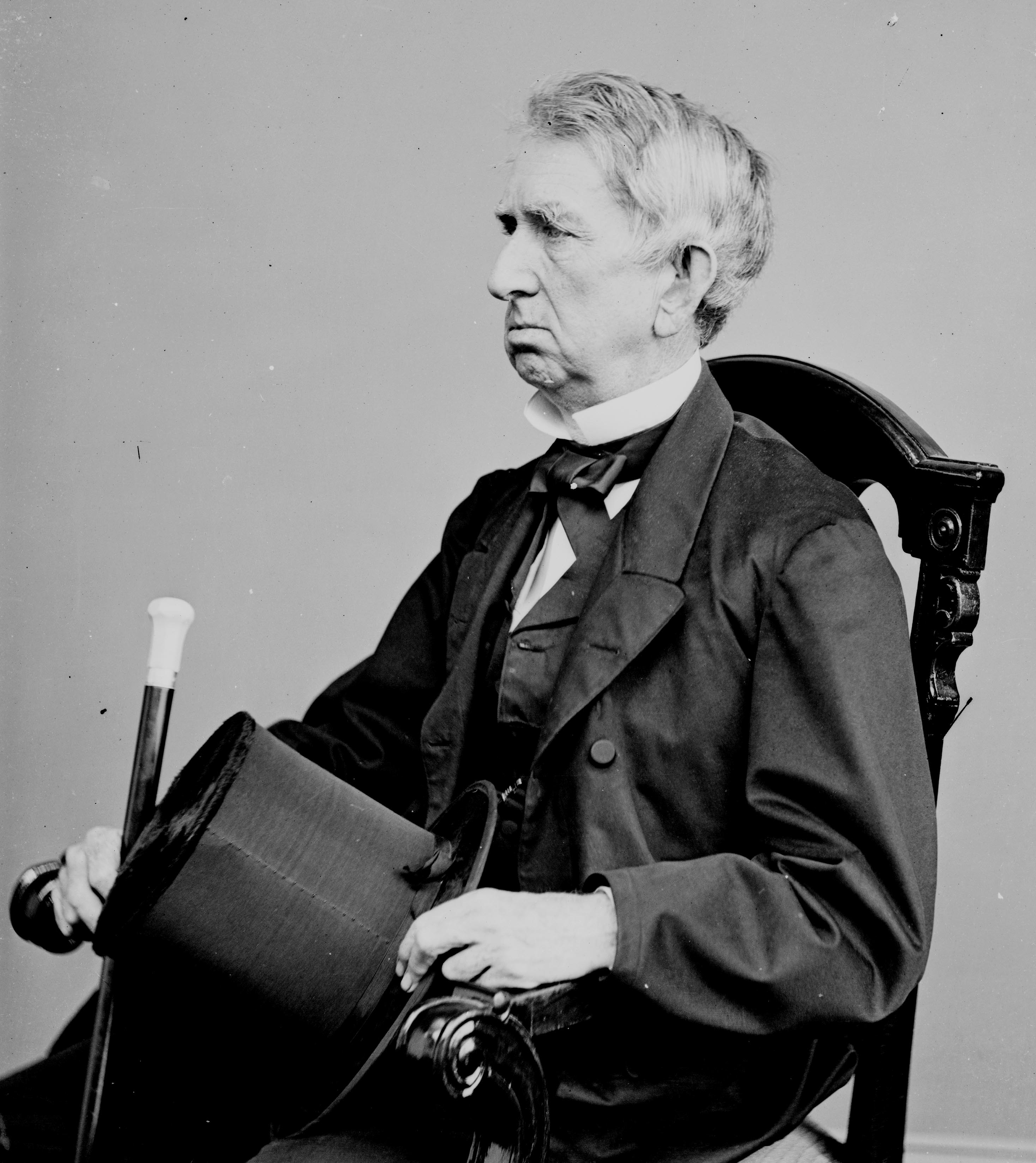
William Seward, Secretary of State, b&w photo portrait c. 1860–1865

- William H. Seward (in office 1861–1869)

Country	Locations	Details	Dates
(Denmark) Danish West Indies	Saint Thomas, St. Croix, Frederiksted, Christiansted	Met with Danish colonial officials during a working vacation. Also met with former Mexican President Antonio López de Santa Anna. Departed from Washington January 1.	January 9–12, 1866
Dominican Republic	Santo Domingo	Met with President Buenaventura Báez and his Cabinet.	January 14, 1866
Haiti	Port-au-Prince	Met with President Fabre Geffrand and his Cabinet.	January 16–17, 1866
Spanish Cuba	Havana	Met with Spanish colonial officials. Returned to U.S. January 28.	January 20–23, 1866

== John Hay ==
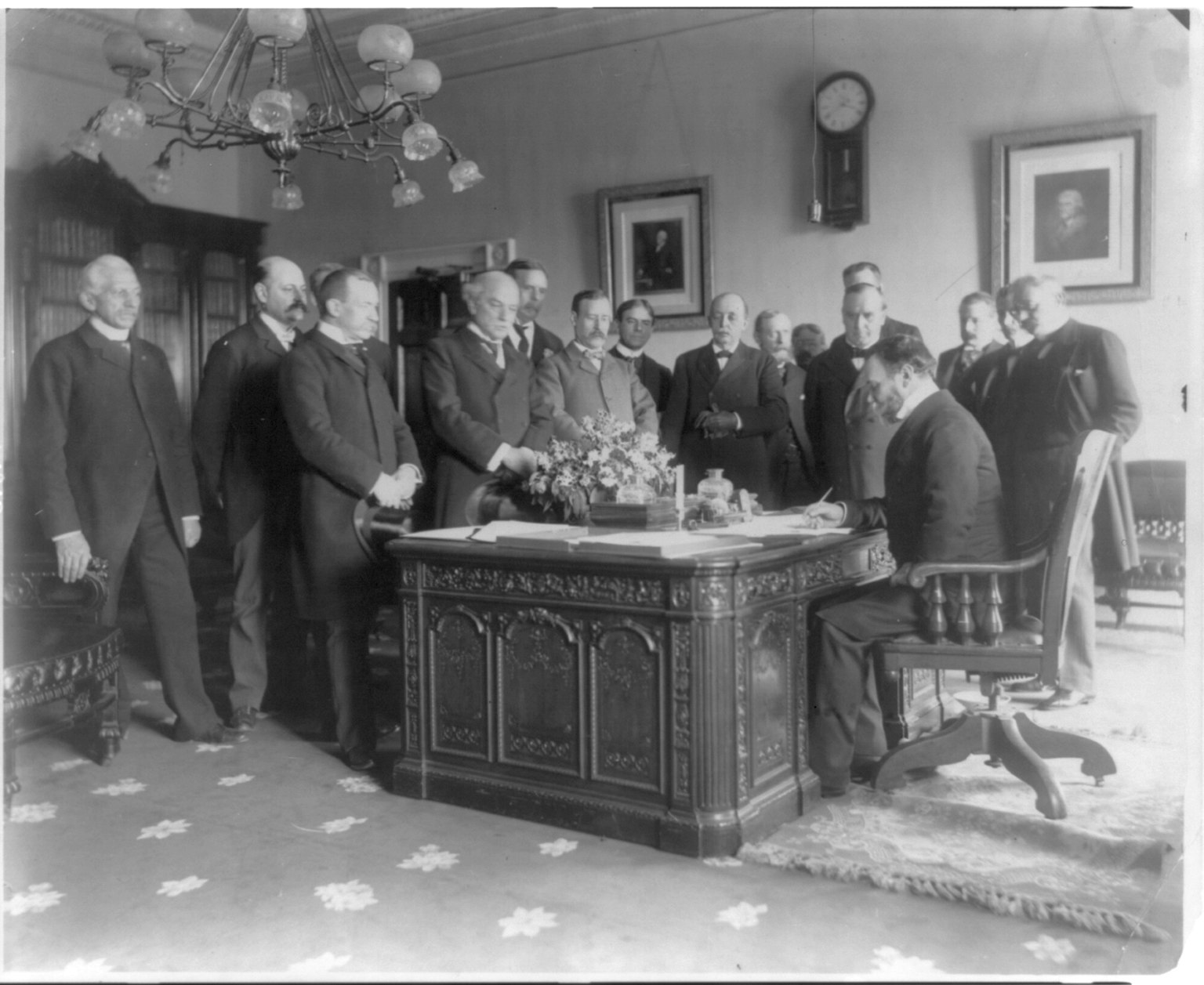
Secretary of State John Hay signing a treaty of peace with Spain at the White House

- John Hay (in office: 1898–1905)

Country	Locations	Details	Dates
Italy	Genoa, Nervi	Vacation trip for health reasons.	April 3–29, 1905
Germany	Bad Nauheim	Vacation trip for health reasons.	April 30 – May 21, 1905
France	Paris	Vacation trip for health reasons.	May 22 – June 1, 1905
United Kingdom	London, Liverpool	Vacation trip for health reasons.	June 2–7, 1905

== Elihu Root ==
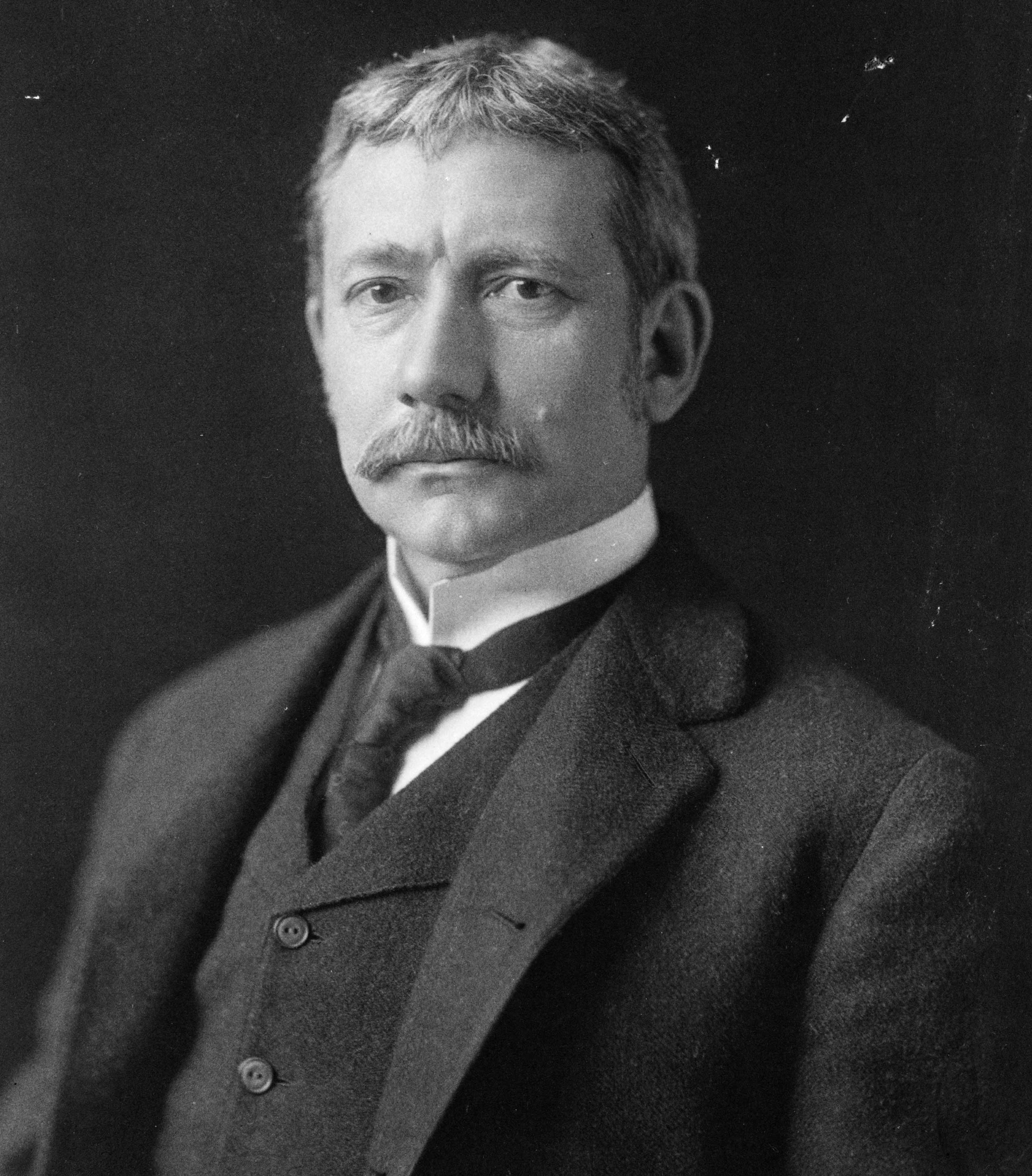
Elihu Root, b&w photo portrait, 1902

- Elihu Root (in office 1905–1909)

Country	Locations	Details	Dates
Newfoundland	Newfoundland, Labrador	Gathered information on the fisheries question during a vacation trip.	August 1–31, 1905
Brazil	Pará, Pernambuco, Bahia, Rio de Janeiro, São Paulo, Santos	Attended Third International Conference of American States. Left U.S. July 4.	July 17 – August 7, 1906
Uruguay	Montevideo	Met with President Jose Batlle y Ordóñez and Foreign Minister Romeu; delivered several public addresses	August 10–13, 1906
Argentina	Buenos Aires, Bahía Blanca	Met with President Figueroa and Foreign Minister Montes; delivered several public addresses	August 14–21, 1906
Chile	Lota, Santiago, Valparaíso	Met with President Germán Riesco and Foreign Minister Jorge Huneeus Gana; delivered several public addresses.	August 31 – September 4, 1906
Peru	Callao, Lima	Met with President José Pardo y Barreda and Foreign Minister Prado; delivered several public addresses.	September 10–16, 1906
Panama	Panama City	Met with President Manuel Amador Guerrero and addressed the National Assembly.	September 20–21, 1906
Colombia	Cartagena	Met with Foreign Minister Alfredo Vázquez-Cobo.	September 24, 1906
Canada	Montreal, Ottawa	Official visit at the invitation of Governor-General Lord Grey.	January 18 – 22, 1907
Mexico	Mexico City, Cuernavaca, Puebla, Orizaba, Guadalajara, Potosí.	Met with President Porfirio Díaz, Foreign Minister Ignacio Mariscal, and governors of several Mexican States. Delivered several public addresses Left Washington September 26.	September 29 – October 16, 1907

== Philander C. Knox ==
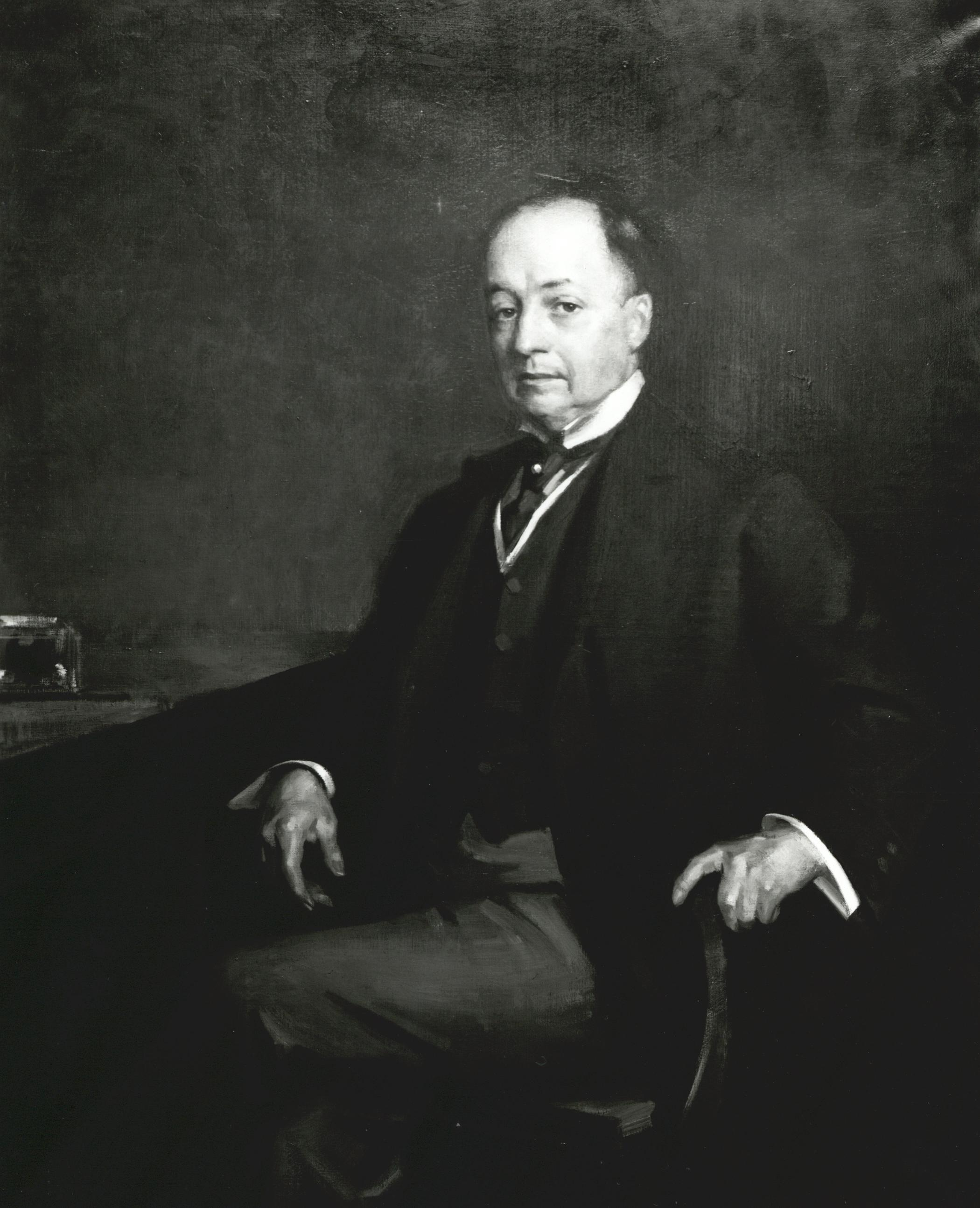
Philander C. Knox, U.S. Secretary of State (2347644925)

- Philander C. Knox (in office 1909–1913)

	Country	Locations	Details	Dates
1	Panama	Colón, Panama City	Met with President Rodolfo Chiari and Foreign Minister Arjona. Left U.S. February 23.	February 27–29, 1912
1	Costa Rica	Limón, San José, Puntarenas	Met with President Jiménez and Foreign Minister Castro Quesada.	March 1–4, 1912
1	Nicaragua	Corinto, Managua	Met with President Adolfo Díaz and Foreign Minister Chamorro; addressed the National Assembly.	March 5–7, 1912
1	Honduras	Amapala	Met with Foreign Minister Vásquez.	March 8–9, 1912
1	El Salvador	Acajutla, San Salvador	Met with President Manuel Enrique Araujo and Foreign Minister Castro Ramírez.	March 10–13, 1912
1	Guatemala	Puerto San José, Guatemala City, Quirigua, Puerto Barrios	Met with President Manuel Estrada Cabrera and Foreign Minister Toledo Herrarte; addressed the Legislature.	March 14–17, 1912
1	Venezuela	La Guaira, Caracas, Puerto Cabello	Met with President Juan Vincente Gómez and Foreign Minister Manuel Antonio Matos; delivered several public addresses.	March 22–25, 1912
2	Dominican Republic	Santo Domingo	Met with President Eladio Victoria.	March 27–28, 1912
2	(Denmark) Danish West Indies	Saint Thomas	Met with Danish colonial (Virgin Islands) officials.	March 30, 1912
3	Haiti	Port-au-Prince	Met with President Cincinnatus Leconte and Foreign Minister Jacques Nicolas Léger.	April 3–4, 1912
3	Cuba	Guantánamo, Santiago, Havana	Met with President José Miguel Gómez and secretary of state Sanguily; returned to U.S. April 16.	April 5–13, 1912
3	Jamaica	Kingston, Port Antonio	Met with British colonial officials during unofficial (Jamaica) visit.	April 8, 1912
4	Japan	Tokyo	Attended funeral ceremony for Emperor Mutsuhito; left U.S. August 22; returned October 11.	September 9–22, 1912

== Robert Lansing ==
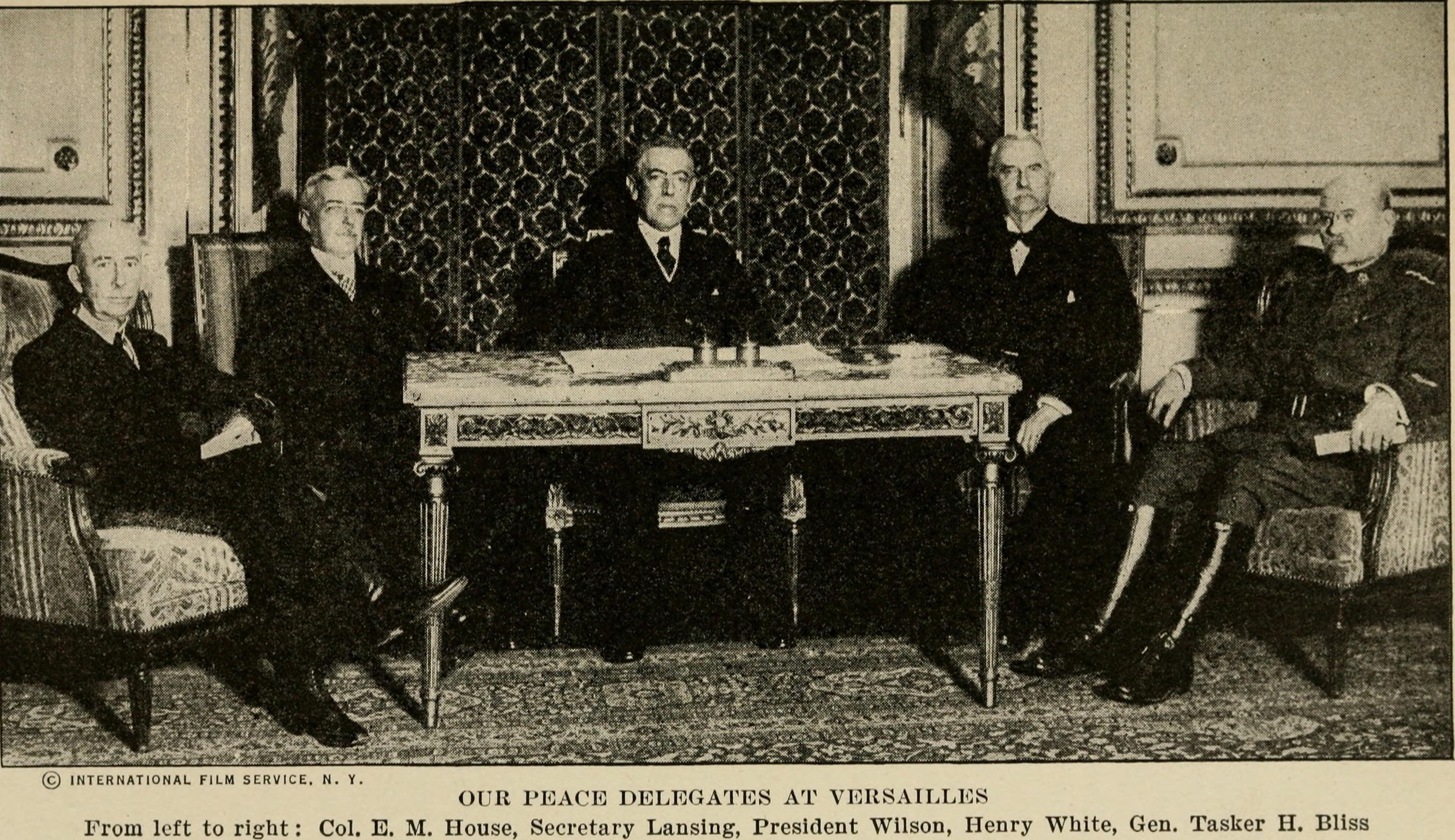
Secretary of State Robert Lansing with U.S. Peace Delegates at Versailles Peace Conference, 1919

- Robert Lansing (in office 1915–1920)

Country	Locations	Details	Dates
France	Paris	Accompanied President Woodrow Wilson to the Paris Peace Conference. Left U.S. December 4, 1918; returned July 22, 1919.	December 14, 1918 – July 14, 1919

== Bainbridge Colby ==
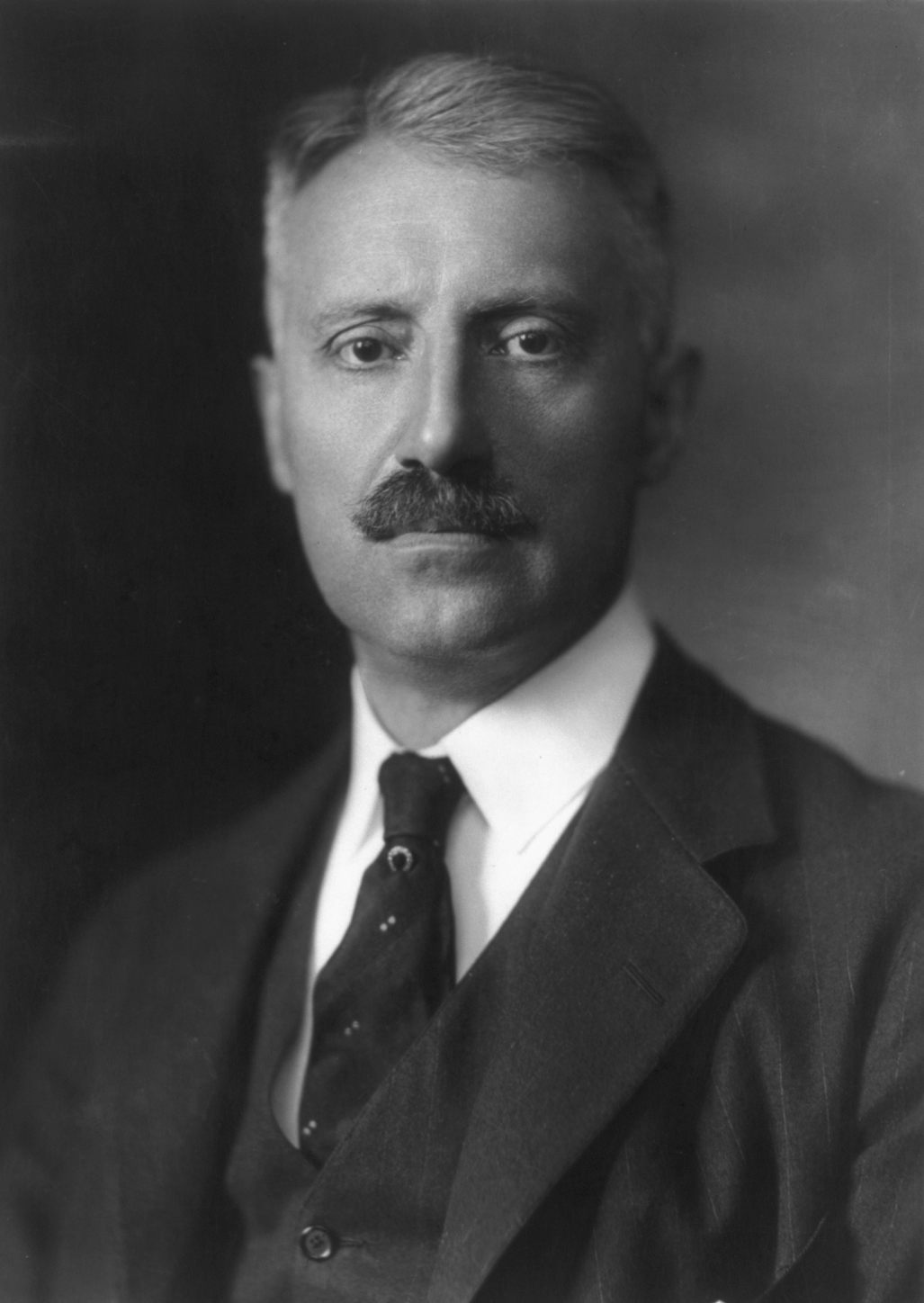
Bainbridge Colby, b&w photo portrait, 1920

- Bainbridge Colby (in office 1920–1921)

Country	Locations	Details	Dates
Barbados	Bridgetown	Met with British colonial officials during a refueling stop en route to South America. Left U.S. December 4.	December 10, 1920
Brazil	Rio de Janeiro	Official visit; repaid visit by President Epitácio Pessoa	December 21–24, 1920
Uruguay	Montevideo	Official visit; repaid 1918 visit by President (then Foreign Minister) Baltasar Brum.	December 28–31, 1920
Argentina	Buenos Aires	Official visit.	January 1–4, 1921
Trinidad and Tobago	Port-of-Spain	Met with British colonial (Trinidad) officials while returning from South America. Returned to U.S. January 26.	January 19–21, 1921

== Charles Evans Hughes ==
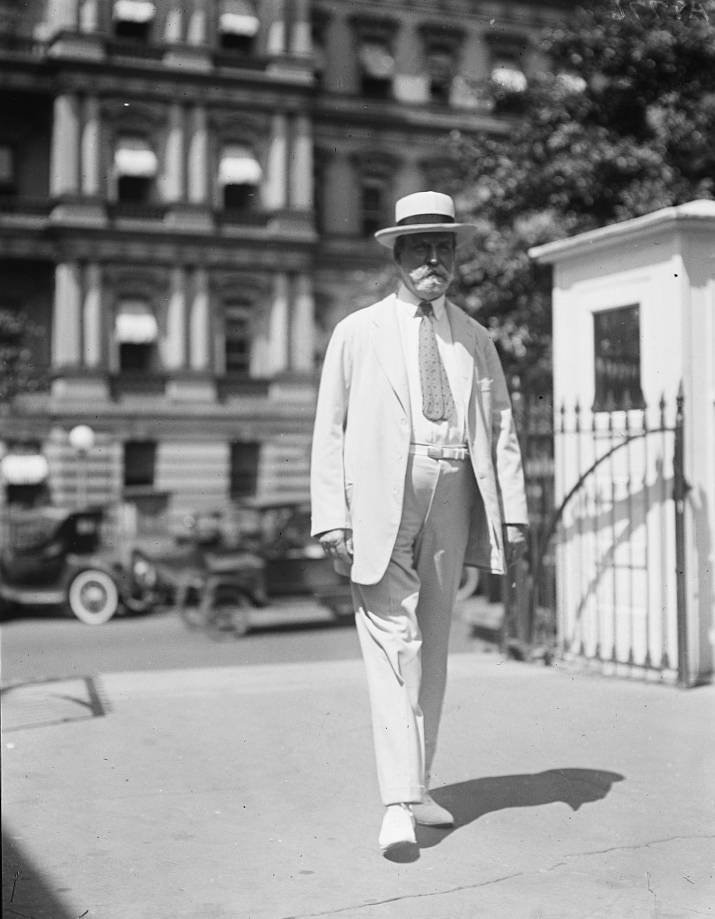
Charles Evans Hughes; State, War and Navy building 44421v

- Charles Evans Hughes (in office 1921–1925)

Country	Locations	Details	Dates
Bermuda	Bermuda	Vacation. Left U.S. February 15; returned March 6.	February 17 – March 4, 1922
Brazil	Rio de Janeiro	Commemorating centenary of Brazilian independence. Left U.S. August 24; returned September 23.	September 5–12, 1922
Canada	Montreal	Addressed meeting of Canadian Bar Association.	September 4–6, 1923
United Kingdom	London	As President of the American Bar Association, attended an international law convention. Left U.S. July 12.	July 19–28, 1924
France	Paris	Visited with French international lawyers.	July 28–31, 1924
Belgium	Brussels, Malines	Received honorary degrees from the universities of Brussels and Louvain.	July 31 – August 2, 1924
Germany	Berlin	Met with President Friedrich Ebert and Foreign Minister Gustav Stresemann. Returned to U.S. August 14.	August 3–4, 1924

== Frank Kellogg ==
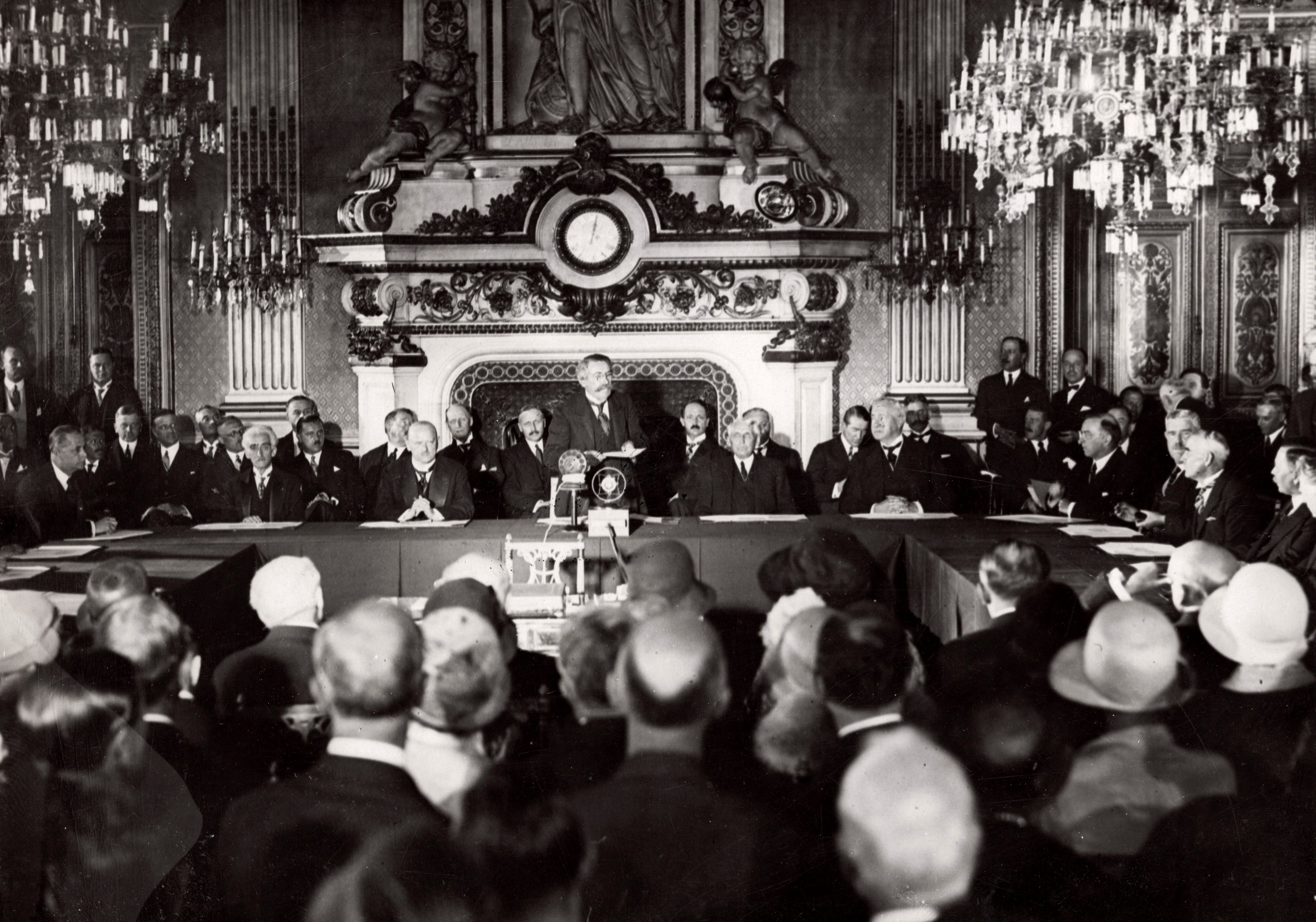
Secretary of State Frank B. Kellogg with French Foreign Minister Aristide Briand during the signing of the Kellogg–Briand Pact, in Paris, 1928

- Frank B. Kellogg (in office 1925–1929)

Country	Locations	Details	Dates
Canada	Fort Erie	Attended dedication of the "Peace Bridge" between Buffalo, New York and Ft. Erie.	August 7, 1927
Cuba	Havana	Attended the Sixth International Conference of American States with President Calvin Coolidge. Left U.S. January 14; returned January 20.	January 15–17, 1928
Canada	Ottawa	Official visit.	February 8–10, 1928
France	Paris	Negotiated and signed the Treaty on the Renunciation of War (Kellogg–Briand Pact). Left U.S. August 19.	August 24–29, 1928
Ireland	Kingstown, Dublin	Official visit while returning from Paris.	August 30 – September 3, 1928
France	Cherbourg	Embarked for the U.S.; returned September 10.	September 4, 1928

== Henry L. Stimson ==
Justice Harlan F. Stone, Mrs. Stone, Mrs. Henry Lewis Stimson and Secretary of State Stimson at the White House for a New Years reception

- Henry L. Stimson (in office 1929–1933)

Country	Locations	Details	Dates
United Kingdom	London	Attended the London Naval Conference. Left U.S. January 8; returned April 30.	January 25 – April 22, 1930
Canada	Toronto	Dedicated the Peace Monument during an unofficial visit.	June 12–14, 1930
Italy	Rome	Prime Minister Benito Mussolini and Foreign Minister Dino Grandi. Left U.S. June 27.	July 9–14, 1931
France	Paris	Met with Premier Laval and Finance Minister Flandin	July 15–19, 1931
United Kingdom	London	Attended conference on the German economic crisis.	July 19–24, 1931
Germany	Berlin	Met with President Paul von Hindenburg and senior German officials.	July 25–27, 1931
Netherlands	The Hague	Met with Dutch officials.	July 27, 1931
United Kingdom	London, Rogart	Met with Prime Minister Ramsay MacDonald; vacationed in Scotland. Returned to U.S. September 3.	July 28 – August 28, 1931
Switzerland	Geneva	Chairman of U.S. delegation to Disarmament Conference. Left U.S. April 8; returned May 14.	April 16 – May 1, 1932

== Cordell Hull ==
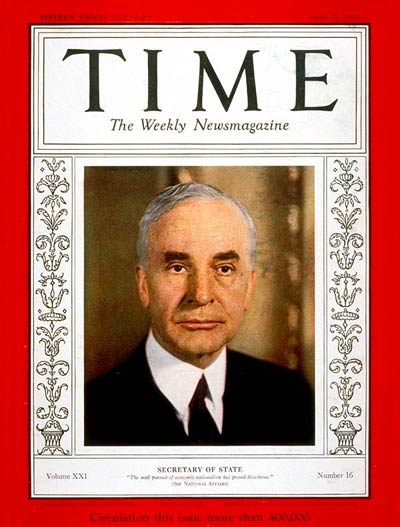
Cordell Hull on the cover of Time Magazine

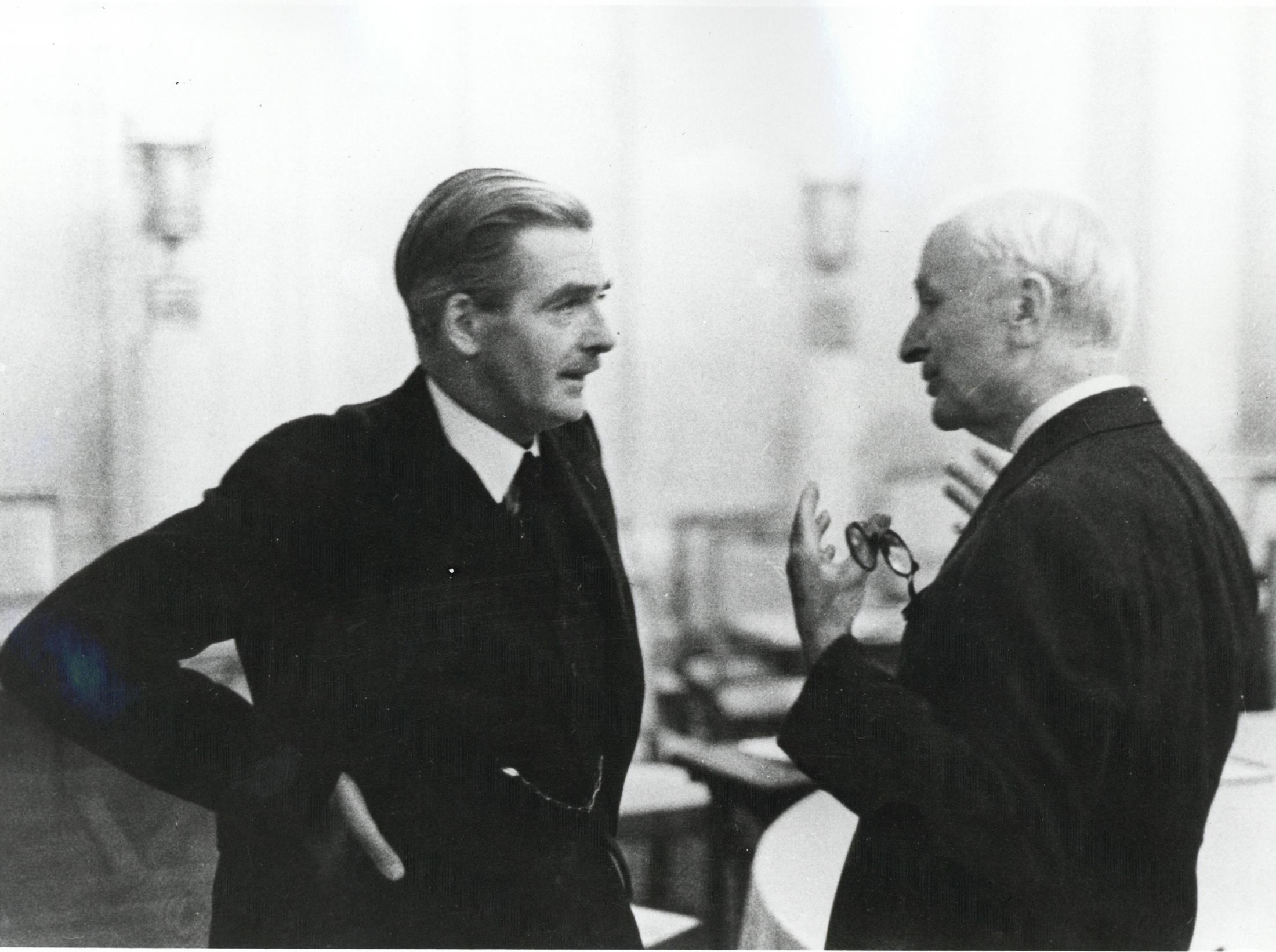
U.S. Secretary of State Cordell Hull conversing with British Foreign Minister Anthony Eden

- Cordell Hull (in office 1933–1944)

	Country	Locations	Details	Dates
1	United Kingdom	London	Chairman of U.S. delegation to the Monetary and Economic Conference. Left U.S. May 31; returned August 1.	June 8 – July 27, 1933
2	Brazil	Rio de Janeiro, São Paulo, Santos	Met with President Getúlio Vargas and Foreign Minister de Mello Franco en route to Inter-American Conference in Montevideo. Delivered several public addresses. Left U.S. November 17.	November 24–25, 1933
2	Uruguay	Montevideo	Attended 7th International Conference of American States.	November 28 – December 26, 1933
2	Argentina	Buenos Aires	Met with President Agustín Pedro Justo and addressed the American Club. Toured Argentine Lake District en route to Chile.	December 27–31, 1933
2	Chile	Santiago, Valparaíso, Antofagasta	Met with President Jorge Alessandri, addressed the Senate, and delivered several public addresses.	January 1–8, 1934
2	Peru	Mollendo, Callao, Lima, Talara	Met with President Óscar R. Benavides and Foreign Minister Solon Polo and delivered several public addresses.	January 9–13, 1934
2	Ecuador	La Libertad, Manta, Bahía de Caráquez	Met with Ecuadorean officials and delivered public addresses.	January 13–14, 1934
2	Colombia	Buenaventura	Met with Colombian officials and delivered public addresses.	January 15, 1934
2	Panama	Panama City	Met with President Harmodio Arias Madrid and Foreign Minister Arosemena. Returned to U.S. January 19.	January 17, 1934
3	Brazil	Rio de Janeiro, Santos	Met with President Vargas and Foreign Minister Macedo Soares en route to Inter-American Conference for the Maintenance of Peace. Left U.S. November 7.	November 19–21, 1936
3	Uruguay	Montevideo	Met with President Gabriel Terra and delivered a public address.	November 24, 1936
3	Argentina	Buenos Aires	Attended Inter-American Conference for the Maintenance of Peace.	November 25 – December 26, 1936
3	Brazil	Rio de Janeiro, Santos	Met with President Vargas and delivered public addresses while returning to U.S.	December 29–31, 1936
3	Trinidad and Tobago	Port-of-Spain	Stopped while returning to U.S. Returned January 13, 1937.	January 8, 1937
4	Canada	Toronto	Returned visit by Prime Minister William Lyon Mackenzie King.	October 22–23, 1937
5	Panama	Panama City	Met with President Domingo Diaz Arosemena and addressed a conference of Foreign Service officers while en route to conference in Lima. Left U.S. November 25.	November 30 – December 1, 1938
5	Colombia	Buenaventura	Delivered a public address en route to conference in Lima.	December 2, 1938
5	Ecuador	Guayaquil	Delivered a public address en route to conference in Lima.	December 4, 1938
5	Peru	Callao, Lima	Attended 8th International Conference of American States.	December 7–27, 1938
5	Ecuador	Guayaquil	Delivered a public address while returning to U.S.	December 30, 1938
5	Colombia	Buenaventura	Delivered a public address while returning to U.S.	January 1, 1939
5	Panama	Panama City	Met with President Arosemena. Returned to U.S. January 9, 1939.	January 3, 1939
6	Cuba	Havana	Attended Conference of American States. Left U.S. July 19; returned August 1.	July 20–30, 1940
7	Canada	Quebec City	Attended Quebec Conference with President Franklin D. Roosevelt. Met with British Prime Minister Winston Churchill, British Foreign Minister Anthony Eden, and Canadian Prime Minister Mackenzie King	August 20–24, 1943
8	French Morocco	Casablanca	Disembarked en route to Moscow Conference. Left U.S. October 7.	October 15, 1943
8	France	Algiers	Met with Generals Dwight D. Eisenhower and Charles de Gaulle.	October 15, 1943
8	Egypt	Cairo	Met with King Farouk, King George of Greece and King Peter of Yugoslavia.	October 16, 1943
8	Iran	Tehran	Met with Shah Mohammed Reza Pahlavi and with British foreign secretary Eden.	October 17, 1943
8	Soviet Union	Moscow	Attended Moscow Conference with British foreign secretary Eden.and Soviet foreign minister Vyacheslav Molotov. Returned to U.S. November 10.	October 18 – November 3, 1943

== Edward Stettinius ==
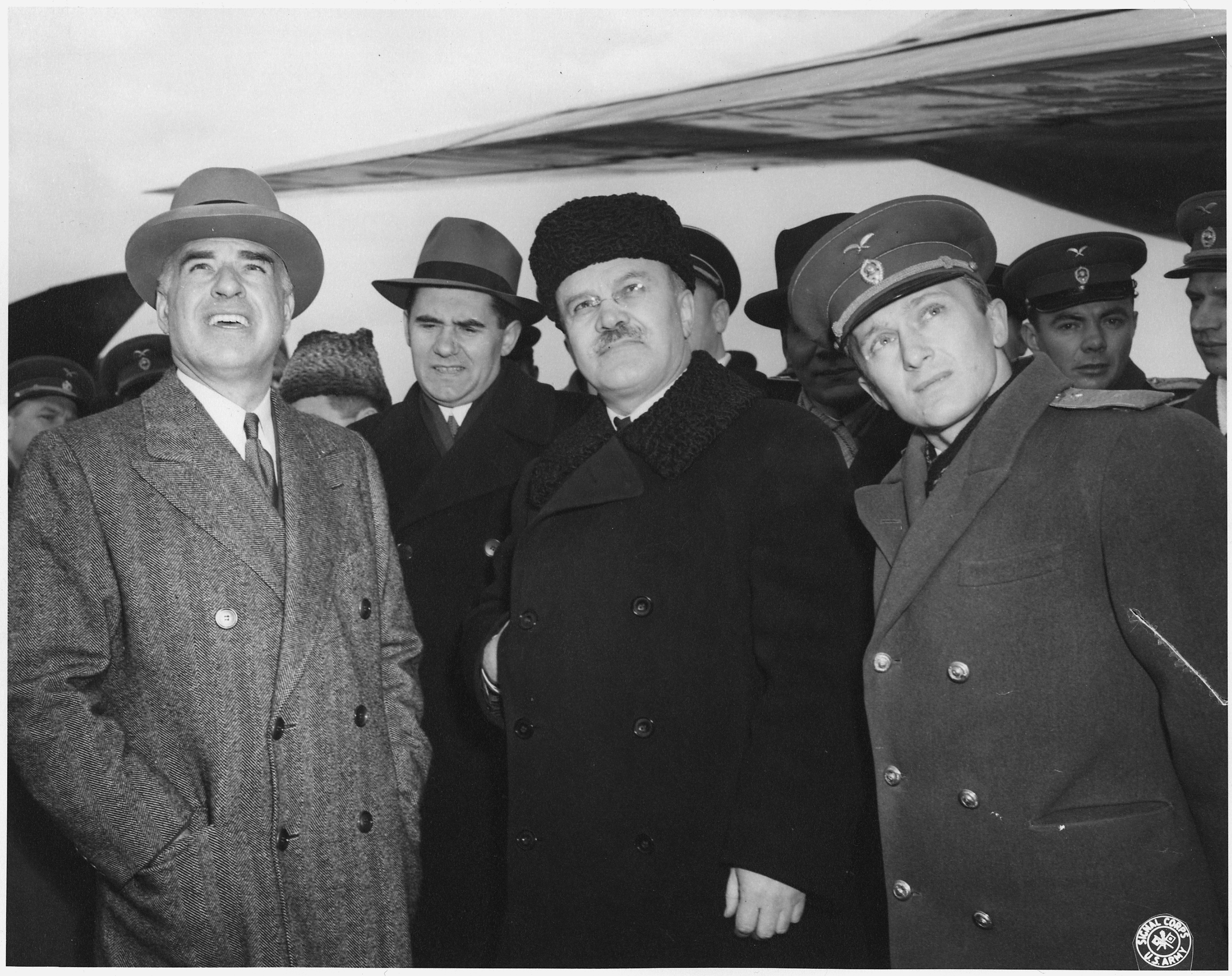
Secretary of State Edward Stettinius with Soviet Foreign Minister Vyacheslav Molotov during the Yalta Conference, in Crimea, 1945

- Edward Stettinius, Jr. (in office 1944–1945)

Country	Locations	Details	Dates
French Morocco	Marrakesh	Preparations for the Malta and Yalta Conferences. Left U.S. January 25.	January 26–30, 1945
Italy	Naples	Discussed postwar issues and policy toward Italy with presidential adviser Harry Hopkins.	January 30–31, 1945
Malta	Malta	Attended the Malta Conference.	January 31 – February 2, 1945
Soviet Union	Yalta, Moscow	Accompanied President Roosevelt to the Crimea conference. Met afterward (February 11–14) with Soviet foreign minister Molotov.	February 3–14, 1945
Egypt	Cairo, Alexandria	Met with Ethiopian emperor Haile Selassie; conferred with President Roosevelt.	February 14–15, 1945
Liberia	Monrovia	Met with President William Tubman.	February 16–17, 1945
Brazil	Rio de Janeiro	Met with President Vargas.	February 17–19, 1945
Guatemala	Guatemala City	Met with the Presidential Triumvirate and Secretary of Foreign Relations Munoz Meany.	February 20, 1945
Mexico	Chapultepec	Attended Inter-American Conference on the Problems of War and Peace.	February 20 – March 8, 1945
Cuba	Havana	Official visit. Returned to U.S. March 10.	March 9, 1945

== James F. Byrnes ==
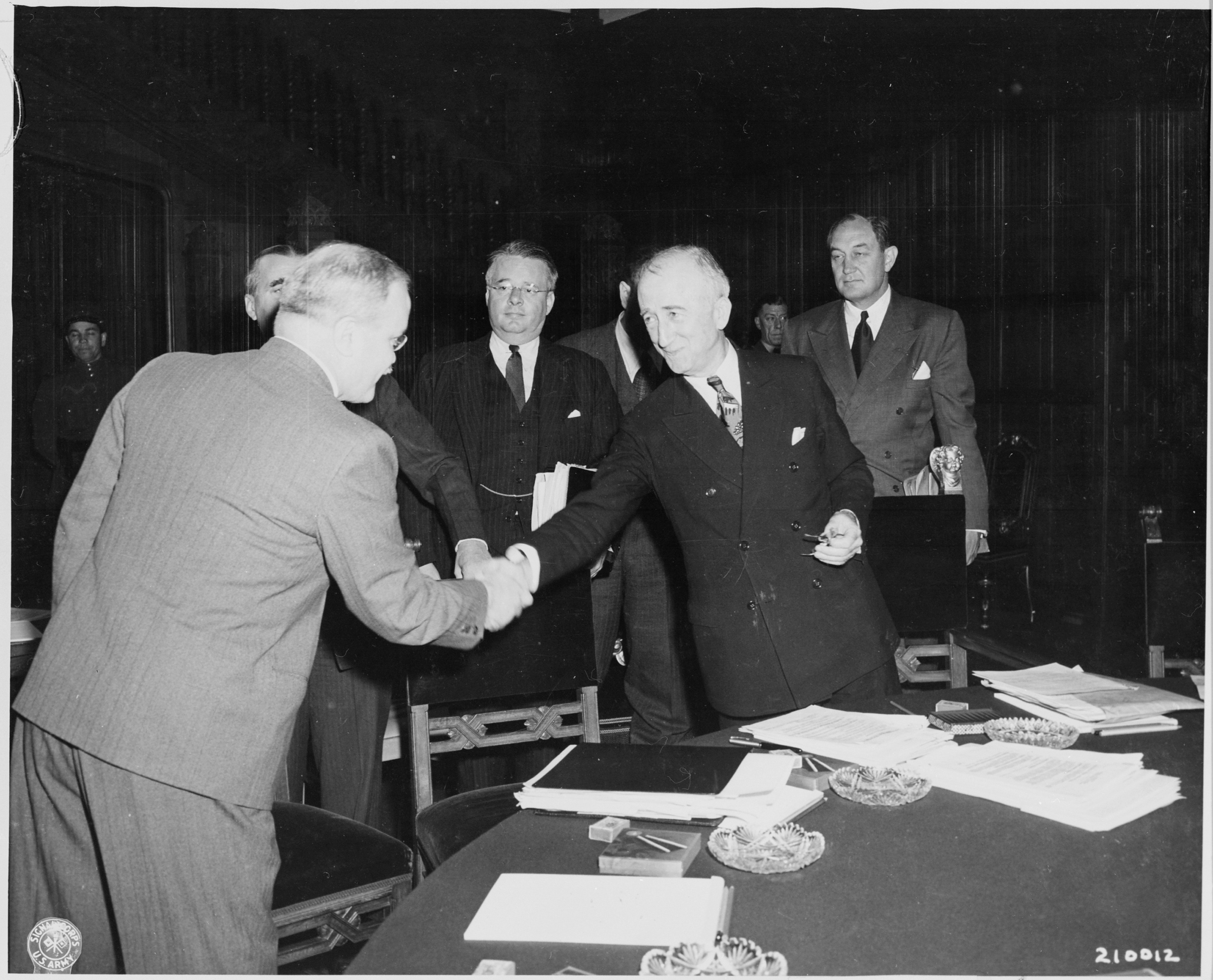
Secretary of State James F. Byrnes with Soviet Foreign Minister Vyacheslav Molotov during the Potsdam Conference, in Potsdam, 1945

- James F. Byrnes (in office 1945–1947)

Country	Locations	Details	Dates
Belgium	Antwerp, Brussels	Disembarked en route to the Potsdam Conference. Left U.S. July 6.	July 15, 1945
Germany	Potsdam	Accompanied President Truman to the Tripartite Conference of Berlin (Potsdam Conference). Met with British Prime Ministers Winston Churchill and Clement Attlee, British Foreign Ministers Anthony Eden and Ernest Bevin, Soviet General-Secretary Joseph Stalin, Soviet Foreign Minister Vyacheslav Molotov, and French Chairman Charles de Gaulle	July 17–25, 1945
United Kingdom	Plymouth	Accompanied President Truman to a meeting with King George VI. Returned to U.S. August 7.	August 2, 1945
United Kingdom	London	Attended Council of Foreign Ministers meeting.	September 5 – October 3, 1945
Soviet Union	Moscow	Ministers meeting. Left U.S. December 12; returned December 29.	December 14–27, 1945
United Kingdom	London	Attended first session of the UN General Assembly.	January 4–26, 1946
France	Paris	Attended Second Session of the Council of Foreign Ministers.	April 25 – May 18, 1946
France	Paris	Attended second part of the Second Session of the Council of Foreign Ministers.	June 13 – July 13, 1946
France	Paris	Attended Paris Peace Conference.	July 28 – October 15, 1946

== George C. Marshall ==
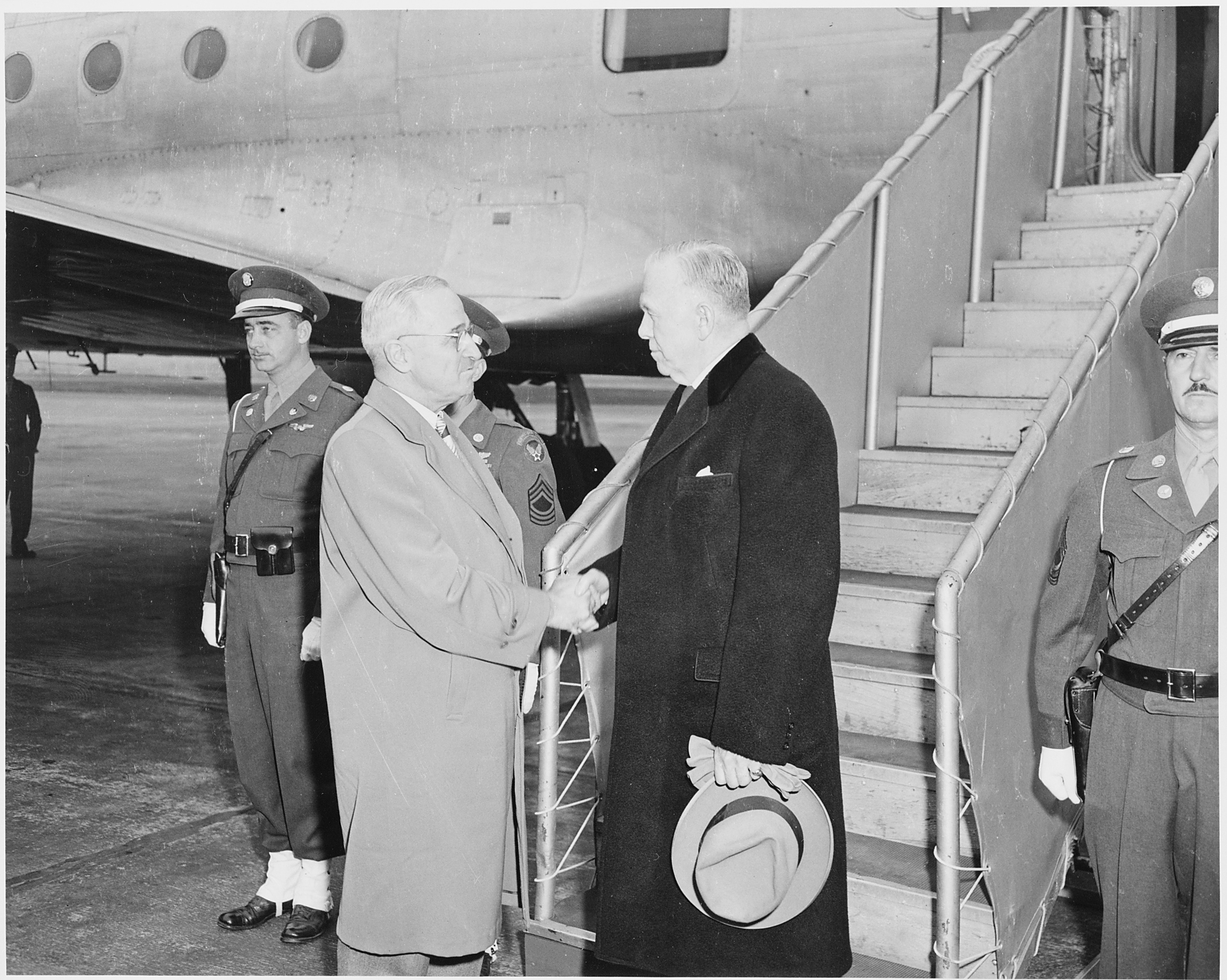
President Truman shakes hands with Secretary of State George Marshall as Secretary Marshall is about to leave on an airplane to attend the London Conference of Foreign Ministers. They are at National Airport in Washington, D. C.

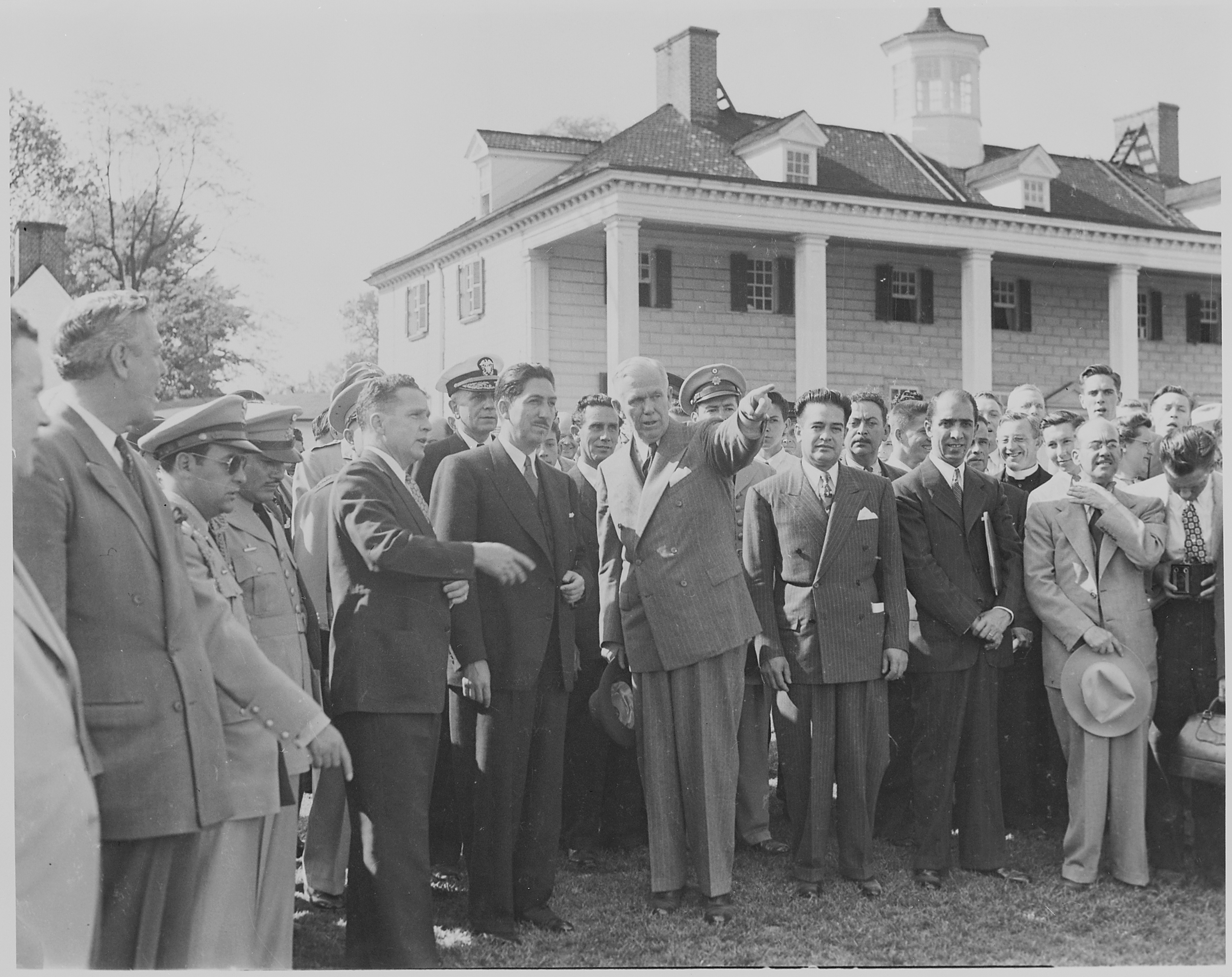
Photograph of Secretary of State George C. Marshall pointing out landmarks at Mount Vernon to Mexican President Miguel Aleman, as other dignitaries look on.

- George C. Marshall (in office 1947–1949)

	Country	Locations	Details	Dates
1	France	Paris	Met with President Vincent Auriol and senior officials. Laid a wreath at the Tomb of the Unknown Soldier. Left U.S. March 5.	March 6–7, 1947
1	Germany	West Berlin	Conferred with U.S. military government officials.	March 7–9, 1947
1	Soviet Union	Moscow	Attended fourth session of the Council of Foreign Ministers	March 10 – April 25, 1947
2	Germany	West Berlin	Held a press conference while returning to U.S. Returned April 26.	April 25, 1947
3	Brazil	Petrópolis	Attended Inter-American Conference for the Maintenance of Continental Peace.	August 15 – September 3, 1947
4	United Kingdom	London	Attended fifth session of the Council of Foreign Ministers.	November 25 – December 15, 1947
5	Colombia	Bogotá	Attended ninth International Conference of American States.	March 30 – April 25, 1948
6	France	Paris	Returned to U.S. October 9-11 to confer with President Harry S. Truman on the Berlin Crisis.	September 20 – October 9, 1948
7	France	Paris	Attended third session of the UN General Assembly.	October 12–16, 1948
7	Greece	Athens	Met with Prime Minister Themistoklis Sophoulis and senior Greek officials.	October 16–18, 1948
7	Italy	Rome, Castel Gandolfo	Met with Prime Minister Alcide De Gasperi, Foreign Minister Carlo Sforza, and Pope Pius XII.	October 19, 1948
7	France	Paris	Attended third session of the UN General Assembly.	October 19–29, 1948
7	United Kingdom	London	Met informally with British officials during a private visit.	October 29 – November 1, 1948
7	France	Paris	Attended third session of the UN General Assembly.	November 1–22, 1948

== Dean Acheson ==
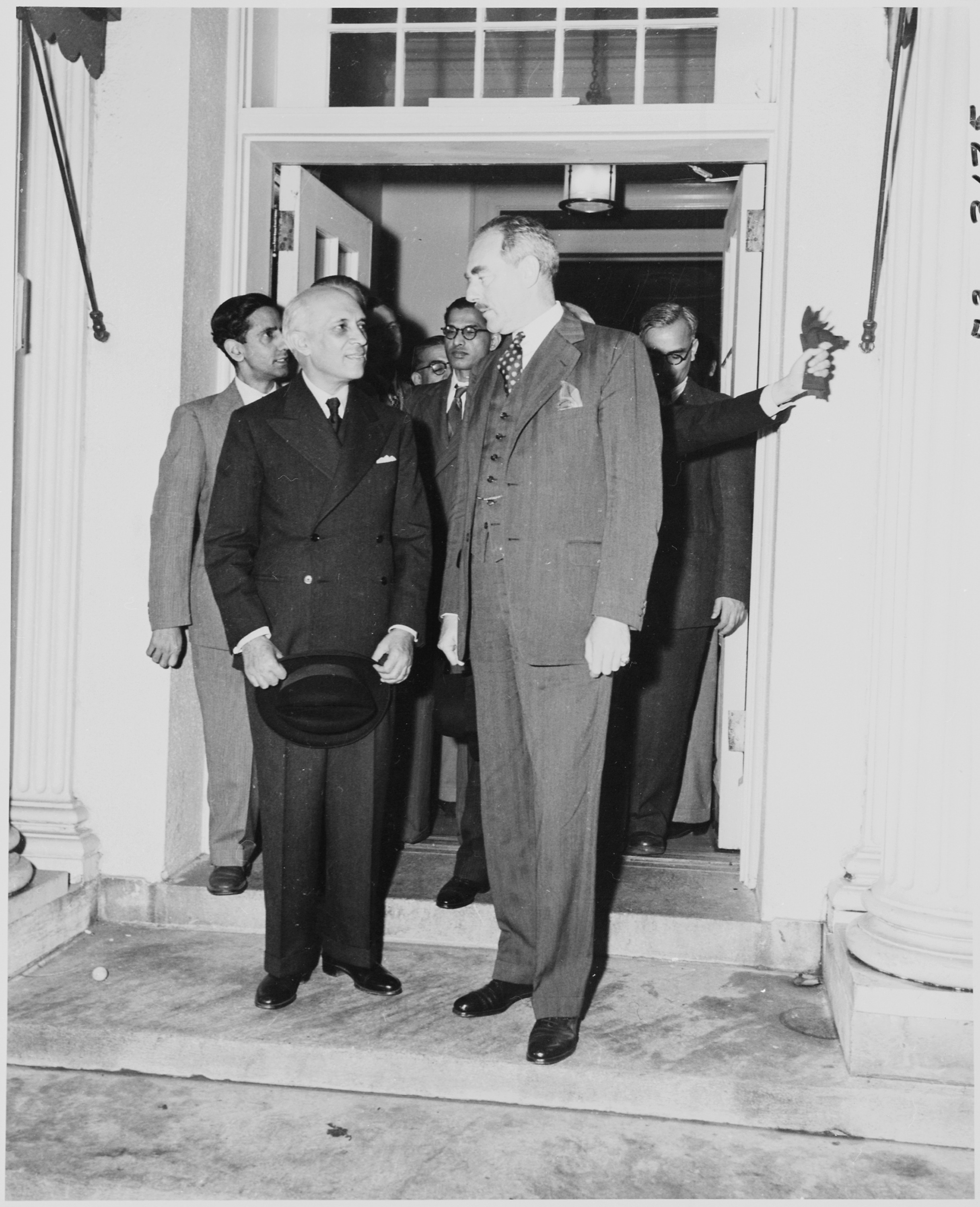
Prime Minister Jawaharlal Nehru of India with Secretary of State Dean Acheson

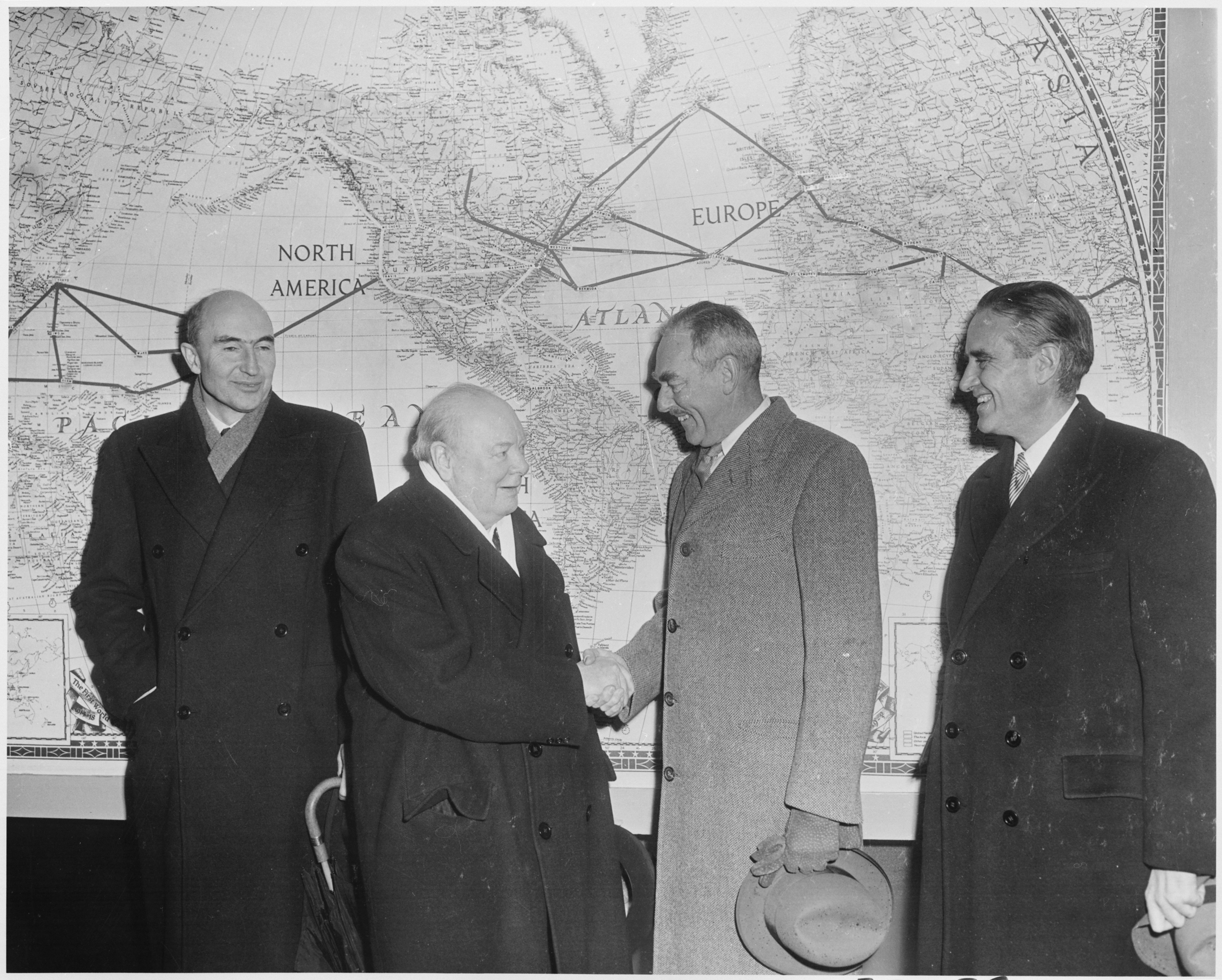
British Prime Minister Winston Churchill shakes hands with Secretary of State Dean Acheson in front of a large map of the world

- Dean Acheson (in office 1949–1953)

	Country	Locations	Details	Dates
1	France	Paris	Attended 6th session of the Council of Foreign Ministers.	May 20 – June 20, 1949
2	France	Paris	Met with the foreign ministers of the United Kingdom, France, Belgium, Luxembourg, and the Netherlands.	November 9–11, 1949
2	West Germany	Frankfurt, Bonn	Met with President Theodor Heuss and Chancellor Konrad Adenauer.	November 11–13, 1949
2	West Berlin East Germany	Berlin	Met with West Berlin officials and the commandants of the occupation sectors. Briefly visited East Berlin.	November 14, 1949
2	France	Paris	Conferred with French; left U.S. May 6.	May 7–8, 1950
2	United Kingdom	London	Attended 6th session of the North Atlantic Council.	May 9–19, 1950
3	Belgium	Brussels	Attended NATO Council Meeting.	December 18–20, 1950
4	Canada	Ottawa	Attended 7th session of the North Atlantic Council.	September 15–20, 1951
5	France	Paris	Attended Sixth session of the UN General Assembly. Left U.S. October 25.	November 6–23, 1951
5	Italy	Rome	Attended 8th session of the North Atlantic Council.	November 23 – December 4, 1951
6	United Kingdom	London	Attended the funeral of King George VI and conferred with the British and French foreign ministers and with West German chancellor Adenauer.	February 13–19, 1952
7	Portugal	Lisbon	Attended 9th session of the North Atlantic Council.	20.–February 26, 1952
7	West Germany	Bonn	Signed Bonn Agreement providing for West German membership in NATO and the European Defense Community.	May 23–26, 1952
7	France	Paris	Signed Protocol to the North Atlantic Treaty regarding the European Defense Community, May 28.	May 26–29, 1952
8	United Kingdom	London	Met with British and French foreign ministers. Received honorary degree from Oxford University.	June 23–28, 1952
8	West Berlin	West Berlin	Spoke at cornerstone laying for the American Memorial Library.	June 29, 1952
8	Austria	Vienna	Met with Austrian officials.	June 29–30, 1952
8	(France) French West Africa	Dakar	Overnight stop en route to Brazil.	July 1, 1952
8	Brazil	Pernambuco, Rio de Janeiro, São Paulo, Belém	Official visit. Addressed the Brazilian Congress.	July 2–8, 1952
8	Trinidad and Tobago	Port-of-Spain	Overnight stop while returning to the U.S.	July 8, 1952
9	Canada	Ottawa	Met with Canadian officials and attended a Cabinet meeting.	November 21–22, 1952
10	France	Paris	Attended a ministerial meeting of the North Atlantic Council.	December 15–20, 1952

== John Foster Dulles ==
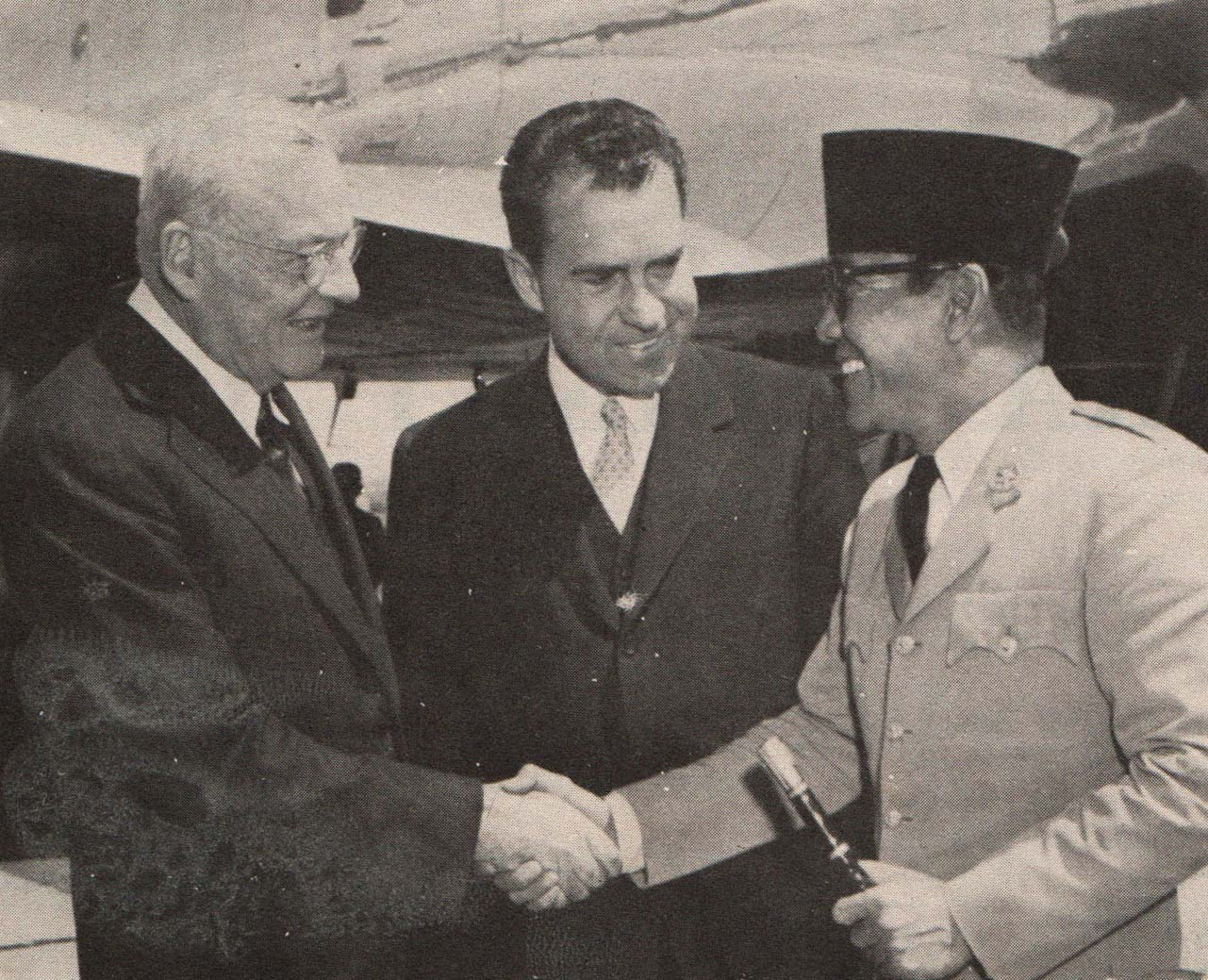
Secretary of State John Foster Dulles and Vice President Richard Nixon with President of Indonesia Sukarno in Jakarta in 1956

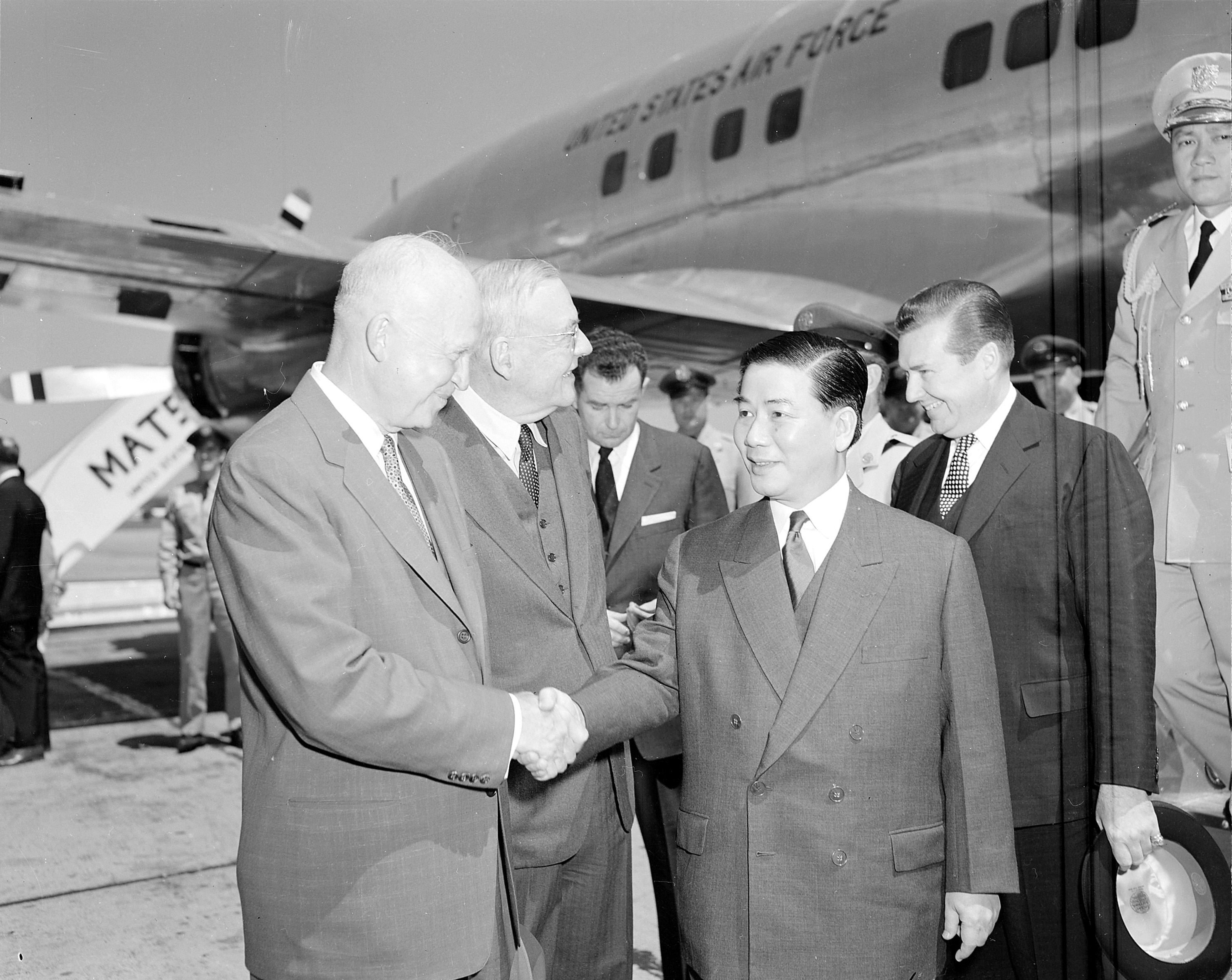
U.S. President Dwight D. Eisenhower and Secretary of State John Foster Dulles (from left) greet South Vietnamese President Ngo Dinh Diem at Washington National Airport in May 1957

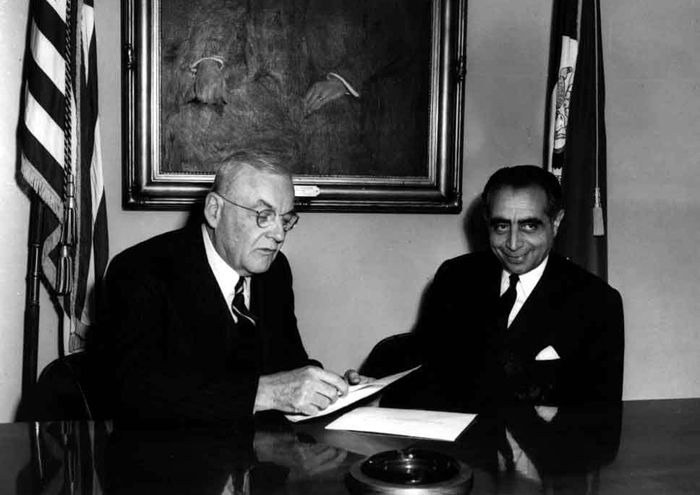
John Foster Dulles (Left) and Ali Amini of Iran

- John Foster Dulles (in office 1953–1959)

	Country	Locations	Details	Dates
1	Italy	Rome	Met with senior Italian officials.	January 31 – February 1, 1953
1	France	Paris	Met with senior French officials and with representatives of NATO and the Organisation for European Economic Co-operation.	February 1–3, 1953
1	United Kingdom	London	Met with Prime Minister Churchill and Foreign Secretary Eden.	February 3–5, 1953
1	West Germany	Bonn	Met with President Heuss and Chancellor Adenauer.	February 5–6, 1953
1	Netherlands	Amsterdam	Met with Queen Juliana and Foreign Minister Johan Beyen.	February 6, 1953
1	Belgium	Brussels	Met with senior Belgian officials.	February 7–8, 1953
1	Luxembourg	Luxembourg	Met with representatives of the European Coal and Steel Community.	February 8, 1953
2	France	Paris	Attended 11th meeting of the North Atlantic Council.	April 21–26, 1953
3	Egypt	Cairo	Met with Prime Minister Mohamed Naguib, Foreign Minister Mahmoud Fawzi, and Egyptian Armed Forces leaders. Attended regional conference of U.S. ambassadors.	May 11–13, 1953
3	Israel	Tel Aviv, Jerusalem	Met with Prime Minister David Ben Gurion and Foreign Minister Moshe Sharett.	May 13–14, 1953
3	Jordan	Amman	Met with Prime Minister Fawzi Mulki and Foreign Minister Hussein Khalidi.	May 14–15, 1953
3	Syria	Damascus	Met with President Adib Shishakli.	May 15–16, 1953
3	Lebanon	Beirut	Met with President Camille Chamoun and senior Lebanese officials.	May 16–17, 1953
3	Iraq	Baghdad	Met with Prime Minister Jameel Al-Madfaai and senior Iraqi officials.	May 17–18, 1953
3	Saudi Arabia	Riyadh, Dhahran	Met with King Ibn Saud and senior Saudi officials.	May 18–19, 1953
3	India	New Delhi	Met with Prime Minister Jawaharlal Nehru and senior Indian officials.	May 20–22, 1953
3	Pakistan	Karachi	Met with Prime Minister Mohammed Ali Bogra and senior Pakistani officials.	May 22–25, 1953
3	Turkey	Ankara, Istanbul	Met with President Celâl Bayar, Prime Minister Adnan Menderes, and senior Turkish officials.	May 25–27, 1953
3	Greece	Athens	Met with Prime Minister Alexandros Papagos and senior Greek officials.	May 27–28, 1953
3	Libya	Tripoli	Met with Prime Minister Mahmud al- Muntasir and senior Libyan officials.	May 28, 1953
4	Japan	Tokyo	Stopped en route to Korea.	August 2, 1953
4	South Korea	Seoul	Signed Korean Mutual Defense Treaty.	August 3–7, 1953
4	Japan	Tokyo	Met with Prime Minister Shigeru Yoshida while returning to U.S. Announced return of the Amami Islands to Japan. Returned to U.S. August 10.	August 8, 1953
5	United Kingdom	London	Met with the British and French Foreign Ministers.	October 15–18, 1953
6	Bermuda	Bermuda	Accompanied President Dwight D. Eisenhower to the Three-Power Conference.	December 4–8, 1953
7	France	Paris	Attended 12th NATO Foreign Ministers Meeting.	December 12–16, 1953
8	West Berlin East Germany	Berlin	Attended Big Four Foreign Ministers Meeting. Sessions of February 1–6, 15, and 17 were held in East Berlin.	January 22 – February 18, 1954
8	West Germany	Bonn	Met with Chancellor Adenauer.	February 18, 1954
9	Venezuela	Caracas	Attended 10th Inter-American Conference.	February 28 – March 13, 1954
10	United Kingdom	London	Discussed the situation in Indochina with Foreign Secretary Eden.	April 11–13, 1954
10	France	Paris	Discussed the situation in Indochina with Foreign Minister Georges Bidault.	April 13–14, 1954
11	France	Paris	Attended meeting of the North Atlantic Council.	April 21–24, 1954
11	Switzerland	Geneva	Attended Geneva Conference on Indochina and Korea.	April 24 – May 3, 1954
11	Italy	Milan	Met with Prime Minister Mario Scelba while returning to U.S. Returned May 4.	May 3, 1954
12	France	Paris	Conferred with Prime Ministers Eden and Pierre Mendès France on the Geneva Conference.	July 13–15, 1954
13	Philippines	Manila	Signed the Southeast Asia Collective Defense Treaty (Manila Pact).	September 3–9, 1954
13	Republic of China	Taipei	Met with President Chiang Kai-shek while returning from Manila.	September 9, 1954
13	Japan	Tokyo	Met with Prime Minister Yoshida and Foreign Minister Okazaki en route from Manila.	September 9–10, 1954
14	West Germany	Bonn	Met with Chancellor Adenauer.	September 16–17, 1954
14	United Kingdom	London	Conferred with British officials during return from Bonn.	September 17–18, 1954
15	United Kingdom	London	Attended Nine-Power Conference on German Question.	September 26 – October 3, 1954
16	France	Paris	Attended NATO, Four- and Nine-Power Conferences. Returned to U.S. October 25.	October 20–23, 1954
17	France	Paris	Attended North Atlantic Council meeting.	December 15–19, 1954
18	Bahamas	Nassau	Vacation	January 29 – February 6, 1955
19	Philippines	Manila	Met with President Ramon Magsaysay en route to Bangkok.	February 21–22, 1955
19	Thailand	Bangkok	Attended first meeting of the SEATO Ministerial Council.	February 22–26, 1955
19	Burma	Rangoon	Met with Premier U Nu and senior Burmese officials.	February 26, 1955
19	Laos	Vientiane	Met with Crown Prince Savang and senior Laotian officials.	February 27, 1955
19	Cambodia	Phnom Penh	Met with King Sihanouk and senior Cambodian officials.	February 28, 1955
19	South Vietnam	Saigon	Met with Premier Ngo Dinh Diem and senior Vietnamese officials.	February 28 – March 1, 1955
19	Philippines	Manila	Attended the opening session of a Chiefs of Mission Conference.	March 1–2, 1955
19	Republic of China	Taipei	Exchanged instruments of ratification of the Mutual Defense Treaty.	March 3, 1955
20	Canada	Ottawa	Official visit.	March 17–19, 1955
21	France	Paris	Attended North Atlantic Council meeting.	May 7–12, 1955
21	Austria	Vienna	Signed the Austrian State Treaty.	May 13–15, 1955
22	France	Paris	Met with the French and British Foreign Ministers and attended a North Atlantic Council meeting.	July 14–16, 1955
22	Switzerland	Geneva	Accompanied President Eisenhower to the Heads of Government Conference.	July 16–23, 1955
23	Canada	Ottawa	Attended meeting of the Joint U.S.-Canadian Commission on Trade and Economic Affairs.	September 25–26, 1955
24	Italy	Rome	Met with President Giovanni Gronchi and Foreign Minister Gaetano Martino. Left Washington October 21.	October 22–23, 1955
24	Vatican City State	Vatican City	Audience with Pope Pius XII.	October 23, 1955
24	France	Paris	Attended working group and NATO Ministerial Meetings.	October 23–26, 1955
24	Switzerland	Geneva	Attended meeting of the foreign ministers of the United Kingdom, France, the Soviet Union, and the United States.	October 26 – November 16, 1955
25	Spain	Madrid	Met with Generalissimo Francisco Franco.	November 1, 1955
26	Austria	Vienna	Unofficial visit. Attended opening of the Vienna State Opera.	November 5–6, 1955
26	Yugoslavia	Pula, Brioni	Met with President Josip Broz Tito.	November 6, 1955
27	France	Paris	Attended NATO Ministerial Meeting.	December 14–17, 1955
27	Malta	Malta	Stopped en route to Pakistan.	March 3–4, 1956
27	Pakistan	Karachi	Attended Second SEATO Council Meeting.	March 5–9, 1956
27	India	New Delhi	Met with Prime Minister Nehru and senior Indian officials.	March 9–11, 1956
27	Ceylon	Colombo	Met with Prime Minister John Kotelawala.	March 11, 1956
27	Indonesia	Jakarta	Met with President Sukarno and senior Indonesian officials.	March 12–13, 1956
27	Thailand	Bangkok	Met with Premier Plaek Phibunsongkhram and senior Thai officials.	March 13–14, 1956
27	South Vietnam	Saigon	Met with President Diem and senior Vietnamese officials	March 14–15, 1956
27	Philippines	Manila	Met with President Magsaysay and senior Philippine officials.	March 15–16, 1956
27	Republic of China	Taipei	Met with President Chiang and senior Chinese Nationalist officials.	March 16–17, 1956
27	South Korea	Seoul	Met with President Syngman Rhee and senior Korean officials.	March 18–19, 1956
27	Japan	Tokyo	Met with Premier Ichirō Hatoyama and Foreign Minister Mamoru Shigemitsu.	March 18–19, 1956
28	France	Paris	Attended NATO Ministerial Meeting.	May 2–7, 1956
29	Panama	Panama City	Accompanied President Eisenhower to a meeting of the presidents of the American Republics.	July 21–24, 1956
29	Colombia	Bogotá	Met with President Gustavo Rojas Pinilla and senior Colombian officials.	July 24–25, 1956
29	Ecuador	Quito	Met with Foreign Minister Villagómez Yépez.	July 25, 1956
29	Peru	Lima	Attended the inauguration of President Prado Ugarteche.	July 26–28, 1956
30	United Kingdom	London	Attended Tripartite Conference on the Suez Canal with the British and French Foreign Ministers.	August 1–2, 1956
31	United Kingdom	London	Attended 22-Power conference on Suez Canal.	August 15–24, 1956
32	United Kingdom	London	Attended second Suez Conference.	September 18–21, 1956
33	United Kingdom	London	Attended NATO Ministerial Meeting.	December 9–14, 1956
34	Australia	Canberra	Attended third meeting of SEATO Council of Ministers. Left Washington March 6; returned March 17.	March 9–14, 1957
35	Bermuda	Bermuda	Attended a meeting between President Eisenhower and Prime Minister Harold Macmillan.	March 21–24, 1957
36	West Germany	Bonn	Attended NATO ministerial meeting.	May 2–4, 1957
36	France	Paris	Met with Prime Minister Guy Mollet and attended meeting of U.S. Chiefs of Mission to European countries.	May 5–6, 1957
37	Canada	Kingston, Ottawa	Personal and private visit. Met informally with Prime Minister John Diefenbaker.	July 26–28, 1957
37	United Kingdom	London	Attended UN disarmament conference.	July 29 – August 2, 1957
38	France	Paris	Accompanied President Eisenhower to meeting of NATO Heads of Government.	December 13–20, 1957
38	Spain	Madrid	Met with Generalissimo Franco and senior Spanish officials while returning from Paris.	December 20, 1957
39	Morocco	Marrakesh	Met with King Mohammed V, Foreign Minister Ahmed Balafrej, and senior Moroccan officials.	January 23, 1958
39	Iran	Tehran	Met with Shah Mohammed Reza Pahlavi and senior Iranian officials.	January 24–26, 1958
39	Turkey	Ankara	Attended Baghdad Pact Ministerial Meeting.	January 26–30, 1958
40	Philippines	Manila	Attended fourth meeting of the SEATO Ministerial Council. Left U.S. March 7.	March 10–13, 1958
40	Republic of China	Taipei	Met with President Chiang and attended a conference of U.S. Chiefs of Mission to Asian countries. Returned March 18.	March 14–16, 1958
41	Denmark	Copenhagen	Attended NATO Ministerial Meeting.	May 3–8, 1958
41	West Berlin	West Berlin	Met with city and U.S. officials.	May 8, 1958
41	France	Paris	Attended the opening session of a conference of U.S. Chiefs of Mission to European countries.	May 8–10, 1958
42	France	Paris	Discussed nuclear armaments with President De Gaulle.	July 4–6, 1958
42	Canada	Ottawa	Accompanied President Eisenhower on an informal visit.	July 8–11, 1958
43	West Germany	Bonn	Met with Chancellor Adenauer on way to meeting of the Baghdad Pact.	July 26, 1958
43	United Kingdom	London	Attended the 5th ministerial meeting of the Baghdad Pact.	July 26–28, 1958
44	Brazil	Rio de Janeiro, Brasília	Official visit.	August 4–6, 1958
45	Italy	Rome	Met with President Gronchi and senior Italian officials.	October 18–19, 1958
45	Vatican City State	Vatican City	Attended funeral ceremonies for Pope Pius XII.	October 19, 1958
45	United Kingdom	Brize Norton	Met with Foreign Secretary Selwyn Lloyd en route to Taipei.	October 19, 1958
46	Republic of China	Taipei	Consultations concerning the Mutual Defense Treaty.	October 21–23, 1958
47	Mexico	Mexico City	Attended the inauguration of President Adolfo López Mateos.	November 30 – December 2, 1958
48	France	Paris	Attended NATO ministerial meeting and a Big Four Ministers meeting.	December 13–18, 1958
48	Colony of Jamaica	High Rock	Vacation	December 19, 1958 – January 3, 1959
49	United Kingdom	London	Met with Prime Minister Macmillan and Foreign Secretary Lloyd.	February 4–5, 1959
49	France	Paris	Met with President De Gaulle, Foreign Minister Maurice Couve de Murville, and NATO secretary general Paul-Henri Spaak.	February 6–7, 1959
49	West Germany	Bonn	Met with Chancellor Adenauer and Foreign Minister Heinrich von Brentano.	February 7–8, 1959

== Christian Herter ==
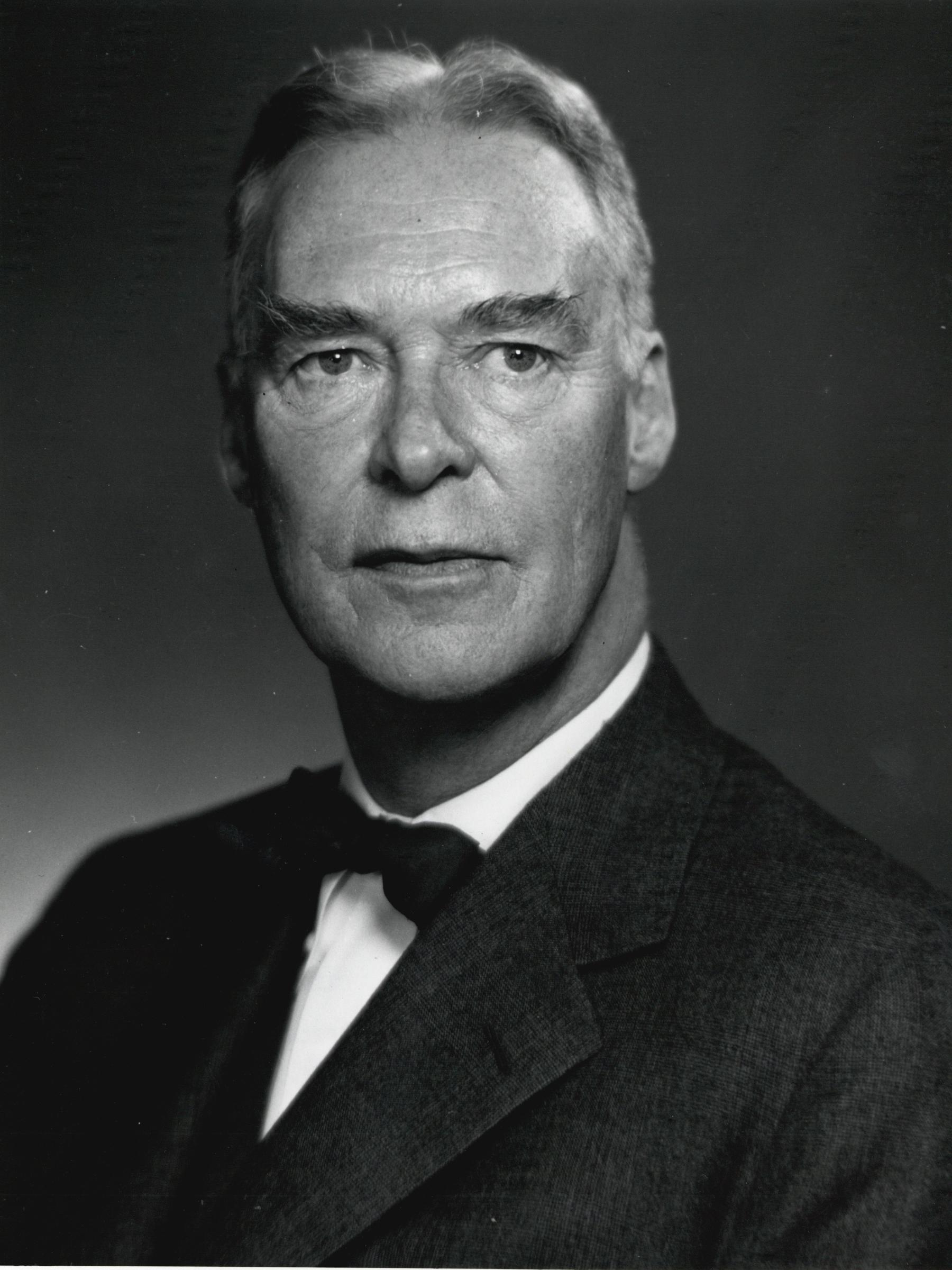
Christian A. Herter, U.S. Secretary of State

- Christian Herter (in office 1959–1961)

	Country	Locations	Details	Dates
1	France	Paris	Attended a meeting of Western Foreign Ministers.	April 27 – May 2, 1959
2	Switzerland	Geneva	Attended a Conference of the Foreign Ministers of France, the United Kingdom, the Soviet Union, and the United States on the questions of Germany and Berlin.	May 11 – June 20, 1959
3	Canada	Ottawa	Informal meeting with Prime Minister Diefenbaker and Minister for External Affairs Howard Charles Green.	July 11, 1959
3	Switzerland	Geneva	Attended second Conference of Foreign Ministers on the German question.	July 13 – August 5, 1959
4	West Berlin	West Berlin	Dedicated John-Foster-Dulles-Allee.	July 25, 1959
5	Chile	Santiago	Attended the 5th Meeting of Consultation of Ministers of Foreign Affairs of the American States.	August 11–18, 1959
6	West Germany	Bonn	Accompanied President Eisenhower to a meeting with Chancellor Adenauer.	August 26–27, 1959
6	United Kingdom	London, Chequers	Accompanied President Eisenhower on an informal visit. Also met with Spanish Foreign Minister Castiella.	August 27 – September 2, 1959
7	France	Paris	Accompanied President Eisenhower to meeting of the North Atlantic Council.	September 2–4, 1959
8	France	Paris	Attended NATO Ministerial Meeting and a meeting of the Heads of State and Government of France, Germany, the United Kingdom, and the United States.	December 13–22, 1959
9	Brazil	Brasília, Rio de Janeiro, São Paulo	Accompanied President Eisenhower on a good will tour.	February 23–26, 1960
9	Argentina	Buenos Aires, Mar del Plata, San Carlos de Bariloche	Accompanied President Eisenhower on a good will tour.	February 26–29, 1960
9	Chile	Santiago	Accompanied President Eisenhower on a good will tour.	February 29 – March 2, 1960
9	Uruguay	Montevideo	Accompanied President Eisenhower on a good will tour.	March 2–3, 1960
10	United Kingdom	London	Overnight stop en route to Tehran.	April 26–27, 1960
10	Iran	Tehran	Attended CENTO Ministerial Meeting.	April 28–30, 1960
10	Turkey	Istanbul	Attended NATO Ministerial Meeting.	April 30 – May 4, 1960
10	Greece	Athens	Met with King Paul I and Prime Minister Karamanlis.	May 5, 1960
11	France	Paris	Accompanied President Eisenhower to a meeting of the Chiefs of State and Heads of Government of France, the Soviet Union, the United Kingdom, and the United States. Also attended a meeting of NATO's Permanent Council.	May 13–21, 1960
12	Costa Rica	San José	Attended the 6th and 7th Meetings of Consultation of the American Foreign Ministers.	August 16–29, 1960
13	Mexico	Mexico City	Attended ceremonies for the 150th anniversary of Mexican independence.	September 15–16, 1960
14	Belgium	Brussels	Personal representative of the President at the wedding of King Baudouin.	December 13–14, 1960
14	France	Paris	Attended NATO Ministerial Meeting.	December 14–18, 1960

== Dean Rusk ==
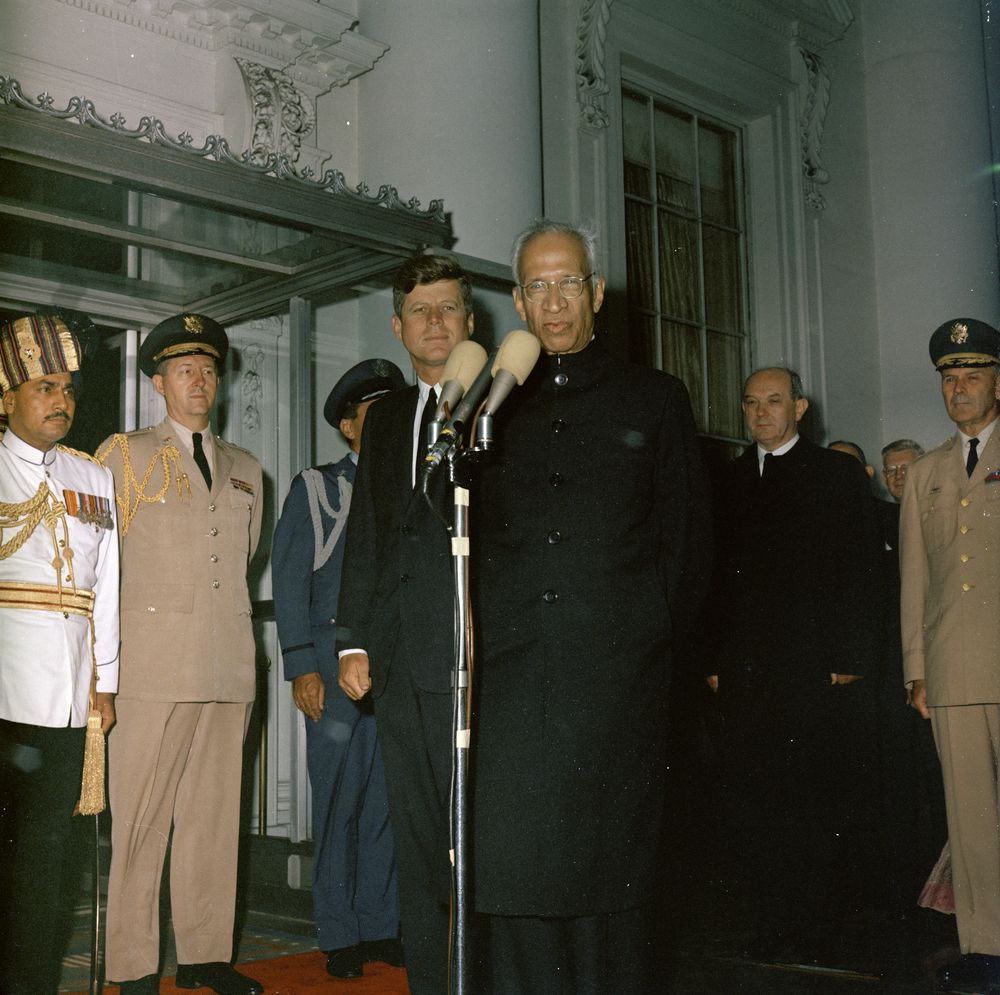
Secretary of State Dean Rusk (2nd right) and President Kennedy at the arrival ceremony for Indian President Dr. Sarvepalli Radhakrishnan

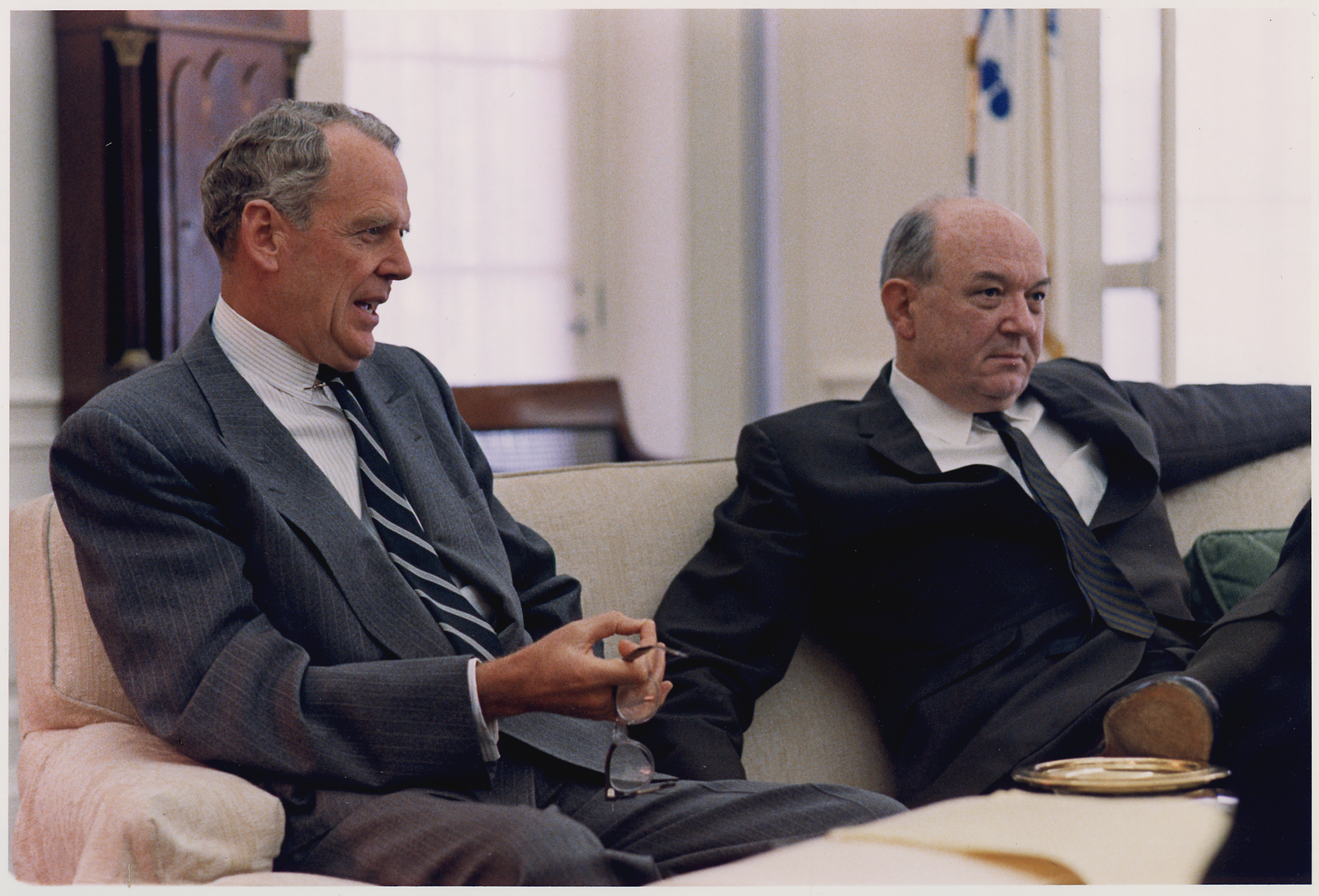
Advisors, Secretary of Defense Clark Clifford and Secretary of State Dean Rusk

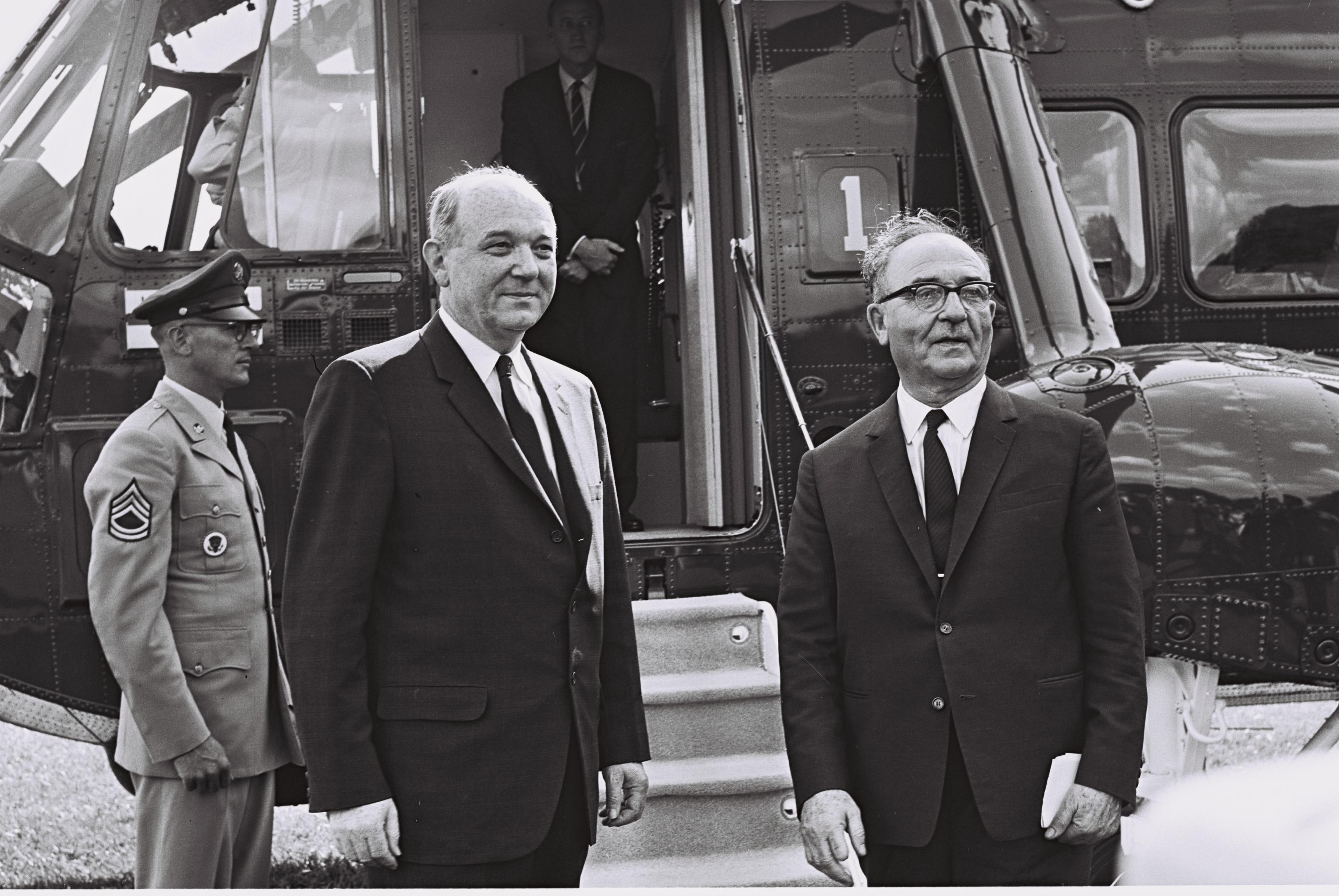
Secretary of State Dean Rusk and Israeli Prime Minister Levi Eshkol

- Dean Rusk (in office 1961–1969)

	Country	Locations	Details	Dates
1	Thailand	Bangkok	Attended the Seventh Annual Meeting of the SEATO Council of Ministers.	March 26–30, 1961
1	India	New Delhi	Met with Prime Minister Nehru.	March 30, 1961
2	Turkey	Ankara	Attended CENTO Ministerial Council Meeting.	April 26–29, 1961
3	Norway	Oslo	Attended NATO Ministerial Meeting.	May 6–10, 1961
3	Switzerland	Geneva	Attended 14-nation Conference on Laos.	May 10–21, 1961
4	France	Paris	Accompanied President Kennedy on State visit.	May 31 – June 3, 1961
4	Austria	Vienna	Accompanied President Kennedy to talks with Soviet Premier Khrushchev.	June 3–4, 1961
4	United Kingdom	London	Accompanied President Kennedy during a private visit.	June 4–6, 1961
5	France	Paris	Attended a Foreign Ministers meeting on Berlin and met with the NATO Permanent Council.	August 4–9, 1961
5	Italy	Rome, Milan, Cadenabbia	Met with Italian Prime Minister Fanfani and Foreign Minister Segni, and, on August 10, with German Chancellor Adenauer.	August 9–10, 1961
6	Japan	Hakone	Attended a meeting of U.S.-Japan Joint Committee on Trade and Economic Affairs.	November 1–4, 1961
6	South Korea	Seoul	Met with President Park and senior Korean officials.	November 4–5, 1961
7	France	Paris	Attended NATO Ministerial Meeting.	December 10–16, 1961
7	Spain	Madrid	Met with Generalissimo Franco and Foreign Minister Castiella.	December 16, 1961
8	Bermuda	Bermuda	Accompanied President Kennedy to a meeting with Prime Minister Macmillan.	December 20–22, 1961
9	Uruguay	Punta del Este	Attended the 8th Meeting of Consultation of the American Foreign Ministers.	January 20 – February 1, 1962
10	Switzerland	Geneva	Attended 18-nation Disarmament Conference.	March 10–27, 1962
11	United Kingdom	London	Attended CENTO Ministerial Council Meeting.	April 29 – May 2, 1962
11	Greece	Athens	Attended NATO Ministerial Meeting.	May 2–6, 1962
12	Australia	Canberra	Attended ANZUS Council Meeting.	May 8–9, 1962
12	New Zealand	Wellington	Met with senior New Zealand officials.	May 10–11, 1962
13	France	Paris	Attended NATO Ministerial Meeting.	June 19–21, 1962
13	West Berlin	West Berlin	Met with Mayor Brandt and signed city's Golden Book.	June 21, 1962
13	West Germany	Bonn	Discussed the Berlin crisis with Chancellor Adenauer and Foreign Minister Schröder.	June 21–23, 1962
13	Italy	Rome	Met with President Segni, Premier Fanfani, and senior Italian officials.	June 23–24, 1962
13	United Kingdom	London, Oxford	Met with Prime Minister Macmillan and Foreign Secretary Home. Received an honorary degree from Oxford University.	June 24–27, 1962
13	Portugal	Lisbon	Discussed extension of U.S. base rights in the Azores.	June 27–28, 1962
14	Switzerland	Geneva	Attended the Conference on Laos.	July 20–25, 1962
15	Canada	Ottawa	Met with Prime Minister Diefenbaker and Minister for External Affairs Green.	August 24–26, 1962
16	France	Paris	Attended NATO Ministerial Meeting.	December 11–16, 1962
16	Ireland	Dublin	Stopped while returning to U.S.	December 16, 1962
17	Costa Rica	San José	Accompanied President Kennedy to the Conference of the Presidents of Central American Republics.	March 18–20, 1963
18	France	Paris	Attended SEATO Ministerial Council Meeting.	April 7–11, 1963
19	Turkey	Ankara	Met with President Gürsel, Premier İnönü, and senior Turkish officials.	April 27–28, 1963
19	Iran	Tehran	Met with Shah Mohammed Reza Pahlavi and Foreign Minister Aram.	April 28–29, 1963
19	Pakistan	Karachi	Attended CENTO Ministerial Meeting.	April 29 – May 2, 1963
19	India	New Delhi	Met with Prime Minister Nehru.	May 2–4, 1963
19	Yugoslavia	Belgrade	Met with President Tito; returned official visit by the Yugoslav Secretary of State for Foreign Affairs Koča Popović.	May 4–5, 1963
20	Canada	Ottawa	Attended NATO Ministerial Meeting.	May 20–24, 1963
21	West Germany	Bonn, Frankfurt	Accompanied President Kennedy.	June 23–26, 1963
21	West Berlin	West Berlin	Accompanied President Kennedy.	June 26, 1963
21	United Kingdom	London	Accompanied President Kennedy.	June 27–30, 1963
21	Italy	Rome, Naples	Accompanied President Kennedy.	June 30 – July 2, 1963
22	Soviet Union	Moscow, Gagra	Signed the Nuclear Test Ban Treaty.	August 3–10, 1963
22	West Germany	Bonn	Discussed the Nuclear Test Ban Treaty with Chancellor Adenauer and Foreign Minister Schröder.	August 10–11, 1963
23	West Germany	Bonn, Frankfurt	Dedicated a memorial to General George C. Marshall in Frankfurt.	October 25–27, 1963
24	France	Paris	Attended NATO Ministerial Meeting.	December 13–18, 1963
24	United Kingdom	London	Met with Foreign Secretary Butler.	December 18–19, 1963
25	Japan	Tokyo	Attended a meeting of Joint U.S.-Japan Committee on Trade and Economic Affairs.	January 24–28, 1964
25	South Korea	Seoul	Met with President Park.	January 29, 1964
27	Philippines	Manila	Attended SEATO Ministerial Council Meeting.	April 11–16, 1964
27	Republic of China	Taipei	Met with President Chiang.	April 16–17, 1964
27	South Vietnam	Saigon	Met with President Khánh and conferred with U.S. officials.	April 17–19, 1964
28	Canada	Ottawa	Attended a meeting of the Joint U.S.-Canadian Committee on Trade and Economic Affairs.	April 30, 1964
29	Belgium	Brussels	Met with Foreign Minister Spaak and officials of the European Economic Community.	May 8–10, 1964
29	Netherlands	The Hague	Attended NATO Ministerial Meeting.	May 10–14, 1964
30	India	New Delhi	Attended the state funeral of Prime Minister Nehru.	May 28–30, 1964
30	Thailand	Bangkok	Met with Prime Minister Kittikachorn and Foreign Minister Khoman.	May 31, 1964
30	South Vietnam	Saigon	Met with Premier Khánh and senior Vietnamese officials.	May 31, 1964
31	Iceland	Reykjavík	Overnight stop en route to Paris.	December 12–13, 1964
31	France	Paris	Attended NATO Ministerial Meeting.	December 13–17, 1964
32	United Kingdom	London	Attended the state funeral of former Prime Minister Churchill.	January 28–30, 1965
33	Iran	Tehran	Attended CENTO Ministerial Meeting.	April 6–9, 1965
33	Switzerland	Geneva	Conferred with U.S. Ambassadors to Middle Eastern countries.	April 9, 1965
34	United Kingdom	London, Runnymede	Attended NATO meeting and dedication of JFK Memorial.	May 12–14, 1965
34	Austria	Vienna	Attended anniversary ceremonies for Austrian State Treaty.	May 15, 1965
35	Venezuela	Caracas	Met with President Leoni.	November 13–14, 1965
35	Argentina	Buenos Aires	Met with Foreign Minister Zavala Ortiz.	November 15–16, 1965
35	Uruguay	Montevideo	Met with President Beltrán.	November 16, 1965
35	Brazil	Rio de Janeiro	Attended the Second Special Inter-American Conference.	November 16–24, 1965
35	Paraguay	Asunción	Met with President Stroessner while returning to U.S.	November 24, 1965
36	France	Paris	Attended NATO Ministerial Meeting.	December 13–16, 1965
36	Spain	Madrid	Met with Generalissimo Franco and senior Spanish officials.	December 16, 1965
37	India	New Delhi	Attended state funeral of Prime Minister Shastri.	January 12–13, 1966
37	Thailand	Bangkok	Met with senior Thai officials.	January 14, 1966
37	South Vietnam	Saigon	Met with Premier Kỳ and Foreign Minister Đỗ.	January 15, 1966
37	Philippines	Manila	Met with President Marcos. Returned to Washington January 19.	January 16, 1966
38	Mexico	Mexico City	Accompanied President Johnson on an informal visit. Dedicated a statue of President Lincoln.	April 15–16, 1966
39	Turkey	Ankara	Attended CENTO Ministerial Council Meeting.	April 19–22, 1966
40	Finland	Helsinki	Met with Foreign Minister Karjalainen.	May 31 – June 1, 1966
40	Norway	Bodø, Oslo	Met with Prime Minister Borten.	June 1–3, 1966
40	Belgium	Brussels	Attended NATO Ministerial Meeting.	June 3–8, 1966
40	West Germany	Bonn	Met with Chancellor Erhard and senior German officials.	June 8–9, 1966
40	United Kingdom	London	Met with Prime Minister Wilson.	June 9–10, 1966
41	Australia	Canberra	Attended SEATO and ANZUS Council Meetings.	June 25 – July 2, 1966
41	Philippines	Manila	Met with President Marcos.	July 2, 1966
41	Republic of China	Taipei	Met with President Chiang and senior Chinese Nationalist officials.	July 3–4, 1966
41	Japan	Kyoto, Tokyo	Attended a meeting of U.S.-Japan Committee on Trade and Economic Affairs.	July 4–7, 1966
41	South Korea	Seoul	Met with President Park and signed an agreement on the status of U.S. forces.	July 8–9, 1966
42	Mexico	Mexico City	Attended the inauguration of a new Foreign Office building.	September 30 – October 1, 1966
43	Japan	Yokota	Stopped en route to Manila.	October 21, 1966
43	Philippines	Manila	Attended the Seven-Nation Conference on Vietnam.	October 21–27, 1966
43	South Vietnam	Cam Ranh Bay	Accompanied President Johnson on a visit to U.S. military personnel.	October 26, 1966
43	Thailand	Bangkok	Accompanied President Johnson on a State visit.	October 27–30, 1966
43	Malaysia	Kuala Lumpur	Accompanied President Johnson on a State visit.	October 30–31, 1966
43	South Korea	Seoul	Accompanied President Johnson on a State visit.	October 31 – November 2, 1966
44	Mexico	Ciudad Acuna	Accompanied President Johnson on a visit to the Amistad Dam.	December 3, 1966
45	Japan	Tokyo	Met with senior Japanese officials.	December 5–7, 1966
45	Republic of China	Taipei	Met with President Chiang and senior Chinese Nationalist officials.	December 7–9, 1966
45	South Vietnam	Saigon	Met with Foreign Minister Đỗ and senior Vietnamese officials.	December 9–11, 1966
45	Thailand	Bangkok	Met with Foreign Minister Khoman and senior Thai officials.	December 11–12, 1966
45	India	New Delhi	Met with Foreign Minister Chagla.	December 12, 1966
45	Iran	Tehran	Met with senior Iranian officials.	December 12–13, 1966
45	France	Paris	Attended NATO Ministerial Meeting.	December 13–16, 1966
46	Argentina	Buenos Aires	Attended the Third Special Inter-American Conference.	February 14–21, 1967
47	Uruguay	Punta del Este	Attended the conference of OAS Heads of State and Foreign Ministers.	April 7–14, 1967
48	West Germany	Bonn, Cologne	Accompanied President Johnson to the funeral of Chancellor Adenauer.	April 23–26, 1967
49	Luxembourg	Luxembourg	Attended NATO Ministerial Meeting.	June 12–14, 1967
49	Ireland	Shannon	Met with Irish Foreign Minister Aiken.	June 14, 1967
50	Belgium	Brussels	Attended NATO Ministerial Meeting.	December 10–15, 1967
51	New Zealand	Wellington	Attended SEATO, ANZUS, and Seven-Nation Meetings.	March 30 – April 5, 1968
52	Iceland	Reykjavík	Attended NATO Ministerial Meeting.	June 22–26, 1968
52	West Germany	Bonn	Met with Chancellor Kiesinger.	June 26, 1968
53	Belgium	Brussels	Attended NATO Ministerial Meeting.	November 12–16, 1968
53	Spain	Madrid	Met with Generalissimo Franco and Foreign Minister Castiella.	November 16–18, 1968
53	Portugal	Lisbon	Met with Premier Caetano and Foreign Minister Franco Nogueira.	November 18–19, 1968

== William P. Rogers ==
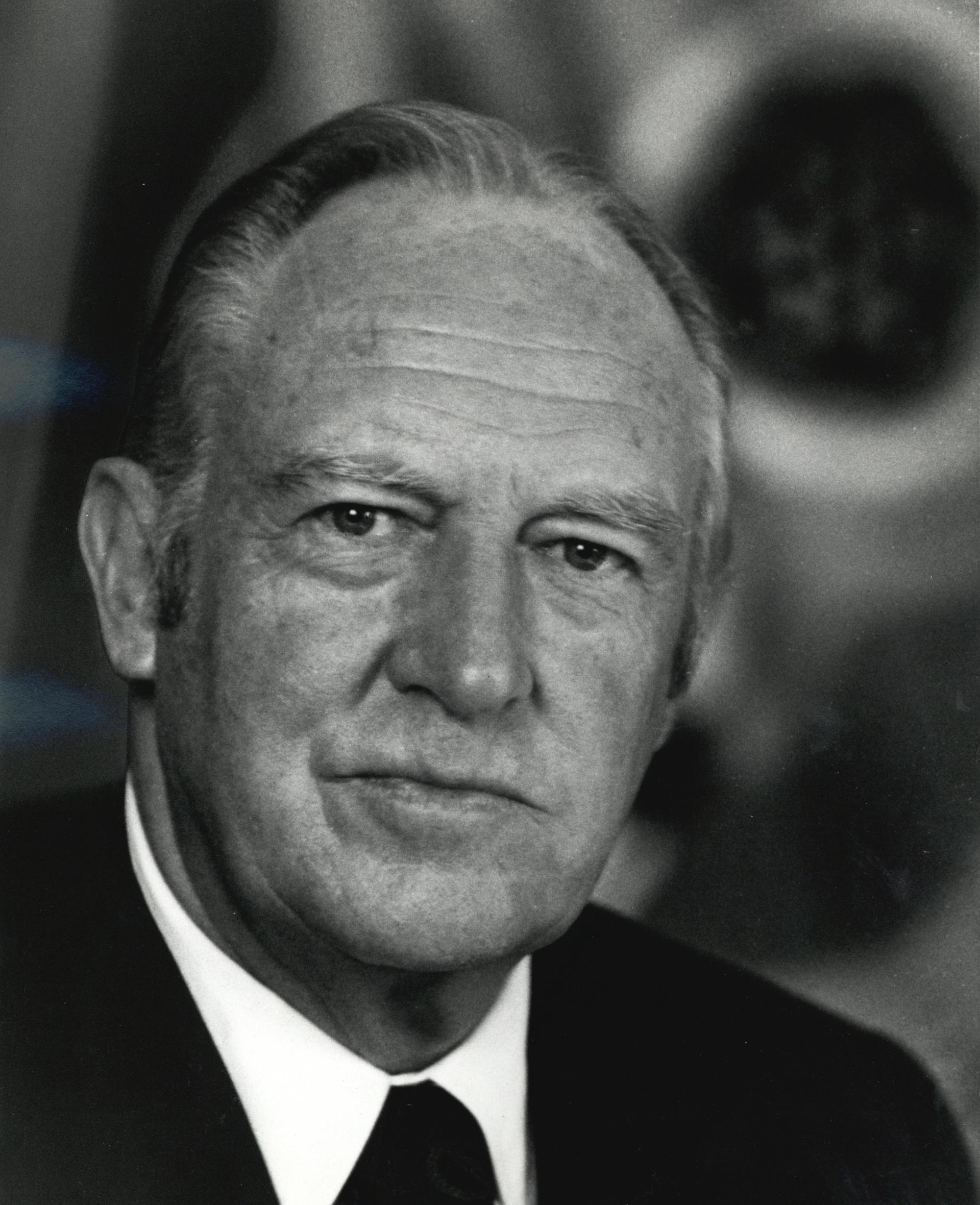
William P. Rogers, U.S. Secretary of State

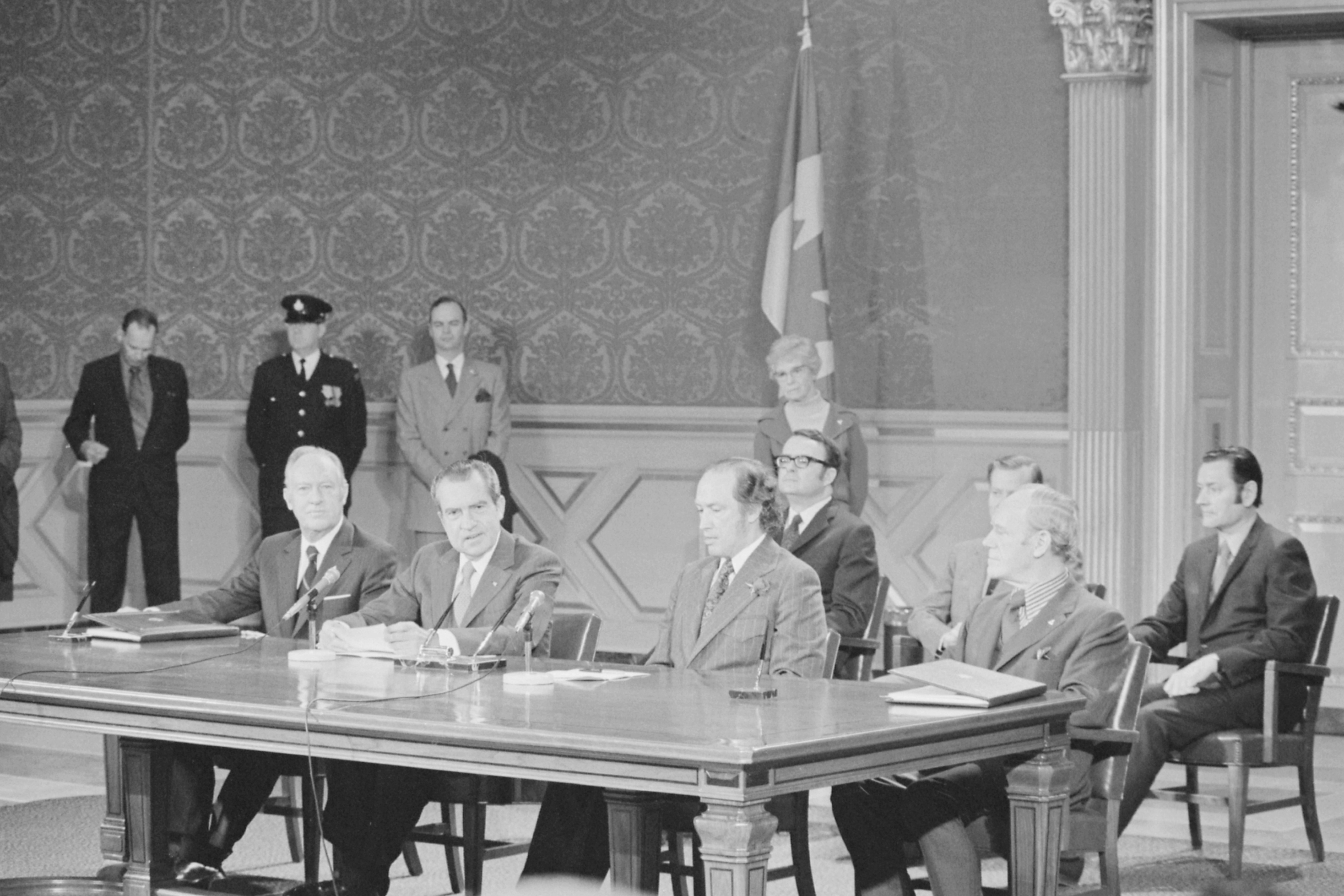
Left to right: Secretary of State William P. Rogers, President Nixon, Prime Minister Trudeau, and Canadian Secretary of State for External Affairs Mitchell Sharp at the signing ceremony for the Great Lakes Water Quality Agreement

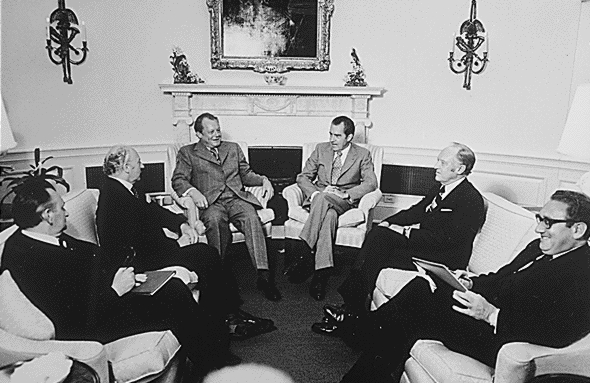
Secretary of State William P. Rogers at a meeting between President Nixon and West German Chancellor Willy Brandt at the White House in 1973

- William P. Rogers (in office 1969–1973)

	Country	Locations	Details	Dates
1	Belgium	Brussels	Accompanied President Nixon; attended the 23rd meeting of the North Atlantic Council.	February 23–24, 1969
1	United Kingdom	London	Accompanied President Nixon on an informal visit.	February 24–26, 1969
1	West Germany	Bonn	Accompanied President Nixon.	February 26–27, 1969
1	West Berlin	West Berlin	Accompanied President Nixon.	February 27, 1969
1	Italy	Rome	Accompanied President Nixon.	February 27–28, 1969
1	Vatican City State	Vatican City	Accompanied President Nixon.	March 2, 1969
2	South Vietnam	Saigon	Met with President Thiệu and U.S. and Vietnamese officials. Left U.S. May 12.	May 14–19, 1969
2	Thailand	Bangkok	Attended the SEATO Council and Seven-Nation Meetings.	May 19–23, 1969
2	India	New Delhi	Met with Prime Minister Gandhi and senior Indian officials.	May 23–24, 1969
2	Pakistan	Lahore	Met with President Yahya and senior Pakistani officials.	May 24–25, 1969
2	Afghanistan	Kabul	Met with King Mohammad Zahir Shah and Prime Minister Etemadi.	May 25, 1969
2	Iran	Tehran	Attended CENTO Ministerial Meeting.	May 26–28, 1969
3	Canada	Montreal	Accompanied President Nixon to the 10th Anniversary ceremonies of the St. Lawrence Seaway.	June 27, 1969
4	Philippines	Manila	Accompanied President Nixon on a State visit.	July 26–27, 1969
4	Indonesia	Jakarta	Accompanied President Nixon on a State visit.	July 27–28, 1969
4	Japan	Tokyo	Attended a meeting of the Joint Committee on Trade and Economic Development. Signed a space cooperation agreement.	July 28–31, 1969
4	South Korea	Seoul	Met with President Park and senior Korean officials.	July 31 – August 1, 1969
4	Republic of China	Taipei	Met with President Chiang and senior Chinese Nationalist officials.	August 1–3, 1969
4	Hong Kong	Hong Kong	Met with British colonial officials and held a press conference.	August 3–5, 1969
4	Indonesia	Bali	Met with Foreign Minister Malik.	August 5–7, 1969
4	Australia	Canberra	Attended ANZUS Council Meeting.	August 7–9, 1969
4	New Zealand	Auckland	Met with Prime Minister Holyoake.	August 9–10, 1969
5	Mexico	Ciudad Acuna	Accompanied President Nixon to the dedication of the Amistad Dam.	September 8, 1969
6	Belgium	Brussels	Attended NATO Ministerial Meeting. Visited the Commission of the European Communities.	December 4, 1969
6	West Germany	Bonn	Met with Chancellor Brandt, Foreign Minister Scheel, and senior German officials.	December 5, 1969
6	Belgium	Brussels	Addressed the Belgo-American Association.	December 6, 1969
6	France	Paris	Met with President Pompidou, senior French officials, and with the U.S. delegation to the Vietnam Peace Talks.	December 6–8, 1969
7	Morocco	Rabat	Met with King Hassan II and senior Moroccan officials. Signed an air transport agreement.	February 7–9, 1970
7	Tunisia	Tunis	Met with President Bourguiba and senior Tunisian officials.	February 9–11, 1970
7	Ethiopia	Addis Abeba	Met with Ethiopian Emperor Haile Selassie and senior Ethiopian officials. Addressed the Organization of African Unity February 12.	February 11–13, 1970
7	Kenya	Nairobi	Met with President Kennyatta and senior Kenyan officials.	February 13–15, 1970
7	Zambia	Lusaka	Met with President Kaunda and senior Kenyan officials.	February 15–16, 1970
7	Zaire	Kinshasa	Met with President Mobutu and senior Congolese officials. Attended a conference of U.S. Chiefs of Mission to African countries.	February 16–18, 1970
7	Cameroon	Douala, Yaounde	Met with President Ahidjo and senior Cameroonian officials.	February 18–19, 1970
7	Nigeria	Lagos	Met with General Gowon and senior Nigerian officials.	February 19–20, 1970
7	Ghana	Accra	Met with Prime Minister Busia and senior Ghanaian officials.	February 20–21, 1970
7	Liberia	Monrovia	Met with President Tubman and senior Liberian officials.	February 21–22, 1970
7	Netherlands Antilles	Aruba	Stopped while returning to U.S.	February 22–23, 1970
8	Italy	Rome	Attended NATO Ministerial Meeting.	May 24–28, 1970
8	Spain	Madrid	Met with Foreign Minister López-Bravo and senior Spanish officials.	May 28–29, 1970
8	Portugal	Lisbon	Met with Prime Minister Caetano and senior Portuguese officials. Amended an air transport agreement.	May 29–31, 1970
9	Philippines	Manila	Attended SEATO Ministerial Council Meeting.	July 1–4, 1970
9	South Vietnam	Saigon	Met with the Foreign Ministers of countries contributing troops to Vietnam.	July 4–7, 1970
9	Japan	Tokyo	Attended a meeting of U.S. Chiefs of Mission to Asian countries and met with Prime Minister Satō and senior Japanese officials.	July 7–10, 1970
9	United Kingdom	London	Met with Prime Minister Heath and Foreign Secretary Home.	July 10–12, 1970
10	Mexico	Puerto Vallarta	Accompanied President Nixon during an official visit.	August 20–21, 1970
11	Italy	Rome, Naples	Accompanied President Nixon during an official visit.	September 27–30, 1970
11	Yugoslavia	Belgrade, Zagreb	Accompanied President Nixon on a State visit.	September 30 – October 2, 1970
11	Spain	Madrid	Accompanied President Nixon on a State visit.	October 2–3, 1970
11	United Kingdom	London	Accompanied President Nixon on an informal visit.	October 3, 1970
11	Ireland	Dublin, Waterville, Timahoe	Accompanied President Nixon on a State visit.	October 3–5, 1970
12	France	Paris	Accompanied President Nixon to the funeral of former President De Gaulle.	November 11–12, 1970
13	Canada	Ottawa	Attended a meeting of the Joint U.S.-Canadian Committee on Trade and Economic Affairs.	November 23–24, 1970
14	Mexico	Mexico City	Attended the inauguration of President Echeverría.	November 29 – December 1, 1970
14	Belgium	Brussels	Attended NATO Ministerial Meeting.	December 2–5, 1970
15	Costa Rica	San José	Attended OAS General Assembly Meeting.	April 13–16, 1971
15	Mexico	Cozumel	Vacation	April 16–18, 1971
16	United Kingdom	London	Attended SEATO Council Meeting.	April 26–29, 1971
16	France	Paris	Met with Foreign Minister Schuman.	April 29, 1971
16	Turkey	Ankara	Attended CENTO Ministerial Meeting.	April 29 – May 1, 1971
16	Saudi Arabia	Riyadh	Met with King Faisal and Foreign Minister Saqqaf.	May 1–2, 1971
16	Jordan	Amman	Met with King Hussein and senior Jordanian officials. Discussed the Jarring Middle East peace initiative.	May 2–3, 1971
16	Lebanon	Beirut	Met with President Frangieh and senior Lebanese officials.	May 3–4, 1971
16	Egypt	Cairo	Met with President Sadat and senior Egyptian officials. Discussed the Jarring peace initiative.	May 4–6, 1971
16	Israel	Tel Aviv	Met with Prime Minister Meir, Foreign Minister Abba Eban, and senior Israeli officials. Discussed the Jarring peace initiative.	May 6–8, 1971
16	Italy	Rome	Met with Foreign Minister Moro and senior Italian officials.	May 8–9, 1971
16	Vatican City State	Vatican City	Audience with Pope Paul VI.	May 8, 1971
17	Portugal	Lisbon	Attended NATO Ministerial Meeting.	June 1–6, 1971
17	France	Paris	Attended the 10th OECD Ministerial Council Meeting.	June 6–9, 1971
18	Bermuda	Bermuda	Vacation	October 29 – November 1, 1971
19	Belgium	Brussels	Attended NATO Ministerial Meeting.	December 7–10, 1971
20	Portugal	Azores (Terceira Island)	Accompanied President Nixon to meeting with French President Pompidou and Portuguese Prime Minister Caetano.	December 12–14, 1971
21	Bermuda	Bermuda	Accompanied President Nixon to meeting with British Prime Minister Heath.	December 20–21, 1971
22	China	Beijing	Accompanied President Nixon on a State visit.	February 17–28, 1972
23	Canada	Ottawa	Accompanied President Nixon on a State visit.	April 13–15, 1972
24	Iceland	Reykjavík	Met with Prime Minister Jóhannesson and Foreign Minister Ágústsson.	May 2–3, 1972
24	United Kingdom	London	Pre-summit consultation with Prime Minister Heath and Foreign Secretary Douglas Home.	May 3–4, 1972
24	Belgium	Brussels	Met with the Belgian and Dutch Foreign Ministers and with the President of the Commission of the European Community.	May 4–5, 1972
24	Luxembourg	Luxembourg	Official visit. Met with Grand Duke Jean and senior Luxembourg officials.	May 5–6, 1972
25	West Germany	Bonn	Met with Foreign Minister Scheel.	June – July 5, 1972
26	Austria	Salzburg	Accompanied President Nixon on an informal visit.	May 20–22, 1972
26	Soviet Union	Moscow, Leningrad, Kiev	Accompanied President Nixon on a State visit.	May 22–29, 1972
26	West Germany	Bonn	Attended NATO Ministerial Meeting.	May 29–31, 1972
26	Poland	Warsaw	Accompanied President Nixon on official visit. Signed consular convention with Poland.	May 31 – June 1, 1972
26	United Kingdom	London	Attended CENTO Ministerial Meeting.	June 1–2, 1972
26	West Germany	Bonn	Met with senior West German officials.	June 2–3, 1972
26		Berlin	Signed Final Quadripartite Protocol to the Quadripartite Agreement on Berlin.	June 3, 1972
27	Australia	Canberra, Perth	Attended SEATO and ANZUS Council Meetings.	June 24–29, 1972
27	Indonesia	Jakarta	Met with President Suharto and Foreign Minister Malik.	June 30 – July 1, 1972
28	Sri Lanka	Colombo	Met with Foreign Minister Bandaranaike while en route to Yemen.	July 1, 1972
28	North Yemen	Sana'a	Announced the re-establishment of diplomatic relations.	July 1–2, 1972
28	Bahrain	Manama	Met with Emir Sheikh Isa bin Salman al-Khalifa.	July 2–3, 1972
28	Kuwait	Kuwait City	Met with Amir Sheikh Sabah as-Salim as-Sabah.	July 3–4, 1972
28	Greece	Athens	Met with Premier Papadopoulas and senior Greek officials.	July 4–5, 1972
28	Romania	Bucharest	Met with President Ceaușescu. Signed consular convention and cultural and scientific exchange agreements.	July 5–6, 1972
28	Hungary	Budapest	Met with First Secretary Kádár. Signed consular convention and scientific and technical exchange agreements.	July 6–7, 1972
28	Yugoslavia	Belgrade, Dubrovnik, Pula, Brion	Official visit. Met with President Tito July 9.	July 7–9, 1972
28	Italy	Rome	Met with President Leone and senior Italian officials	July 10–11, 1972
28	Vatican City State	Vatican City	Audience with Pope Paul VI.	July 11, 1972
29	Belgium	Brussels	Attended NATO Ministerial Meeting.	December 5–8, 1972
30	France	Paris	Signed the Vietnam Peace Agreement.	January 26–27, 1973
31	France	Paris	Attended the International Conference on Vietnam.	February 24 – March 3, 1973
32	Mexico	Mexico City	Met with President Echeverría and senior Mexican officials.	May 12–14, 1973
32	Nicaragua	Managua	Met with President Somoza and senior Nicaraguan officials.	May 14, 1973
32	Venezuela	Caracas	Met with President Caldera, Foreign Minister Calvani and senior Venezuelan officials.	May 14–15, 1973
32	Peru	Lima	Met with President Velasco and addressed the Andean Pact Junta.	May 15–16, 1973
32	Colombia	Bogotá	Met with President Pastrana, Foreign Minister Vázquez, and senior Colombian officials.	May 17–18, 1973
32	Brazil	Rio de Janeiro, Brasília	Met with President Médici and senior Brazilian officials.	May 19–22, 1973
32	Argentina	Buenos Aires	Attended the inauguration of President Cámpora.	May 23–26, 1973
32	Netherlands Antilles	Curaçao	Stopped en route to Jamaica.	May 27, 1973
32	Jamaica	Kingston	Met with Prime Minister Manley and senior officials.	May 27–28, 1973
33	Iceland	Reykjavík	Accompanied President Nixon to a meeting with French President Pompidou.	May 30 – June 1, 1973
34	Iran	Tehran	Attended CENTO Council Meeting.	June 8–11, 1973
34	Denmark	Copenhagen	Attended NATO Ministerial Meeting.	June 12–15, 1973
35	United Kingdom	London	Attended the birthday party of former Prime Minister Douglas-Home.	July 1, 1973
35	Finland	Helsinki	Attended the first phase of the Conference on Security and Cooperation in Europe.	July 1–3, 1973
36	Czechoslovakia	Prague	Official visit. Signed a consular convention.	July 8–9, 1973
37	Japan	Tokyo	Attended a meeting of the Joint U.S.-Japan Committee on Trade and Economic Affairs.	July 15–17, 1973
37	South Korea	Seoul	Met with President Park and senior Korean officials.	July 18–20, 1973

== Henry Kissinger ==
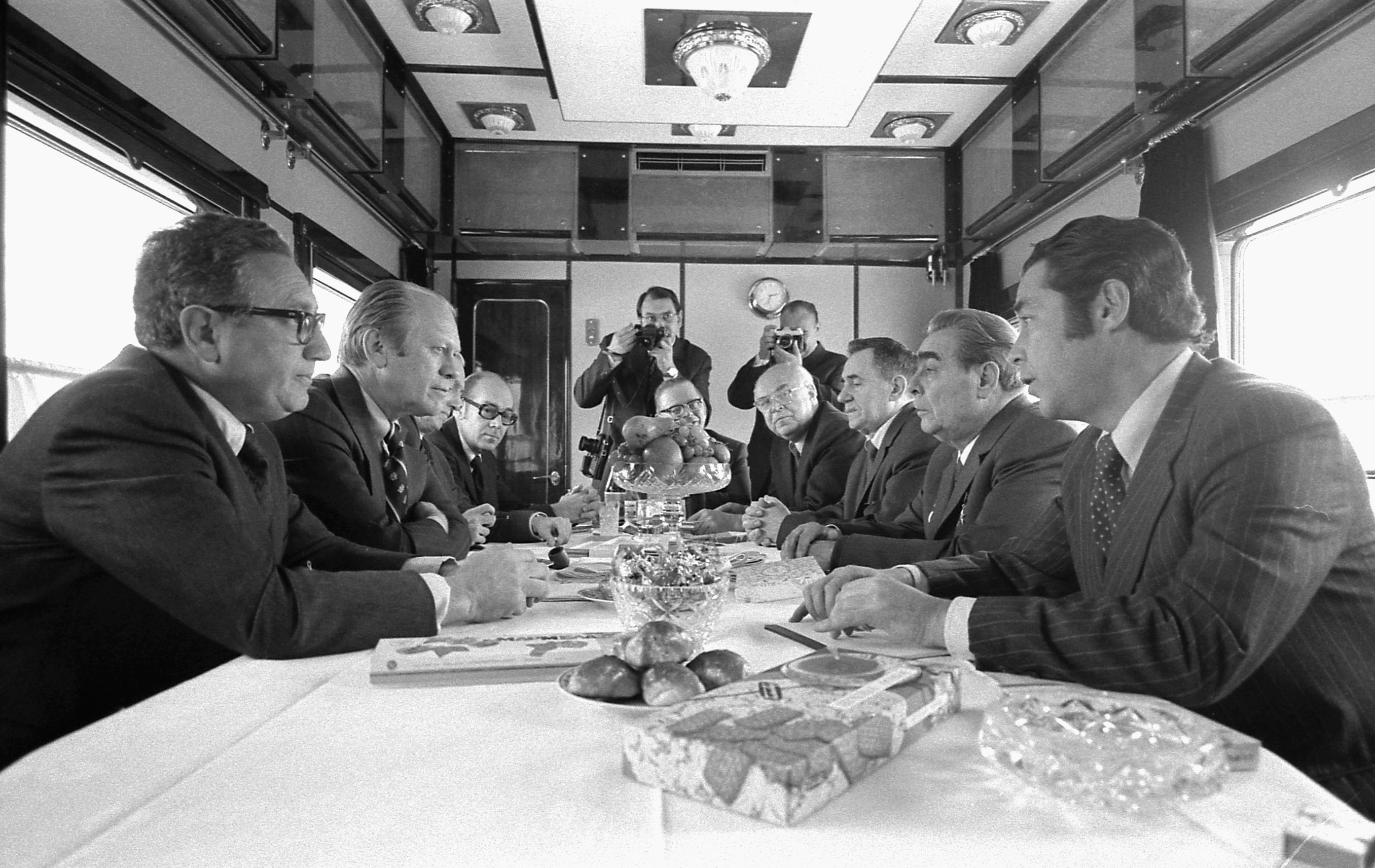
Secretary of State Henry Kissinger and President Gerald Ford with Soviet general secretary Leonid Brezhnev and Soviet Foreign Minister Andrey Gromyko on aboard a Soviet train headed for Vladivostok, 1974

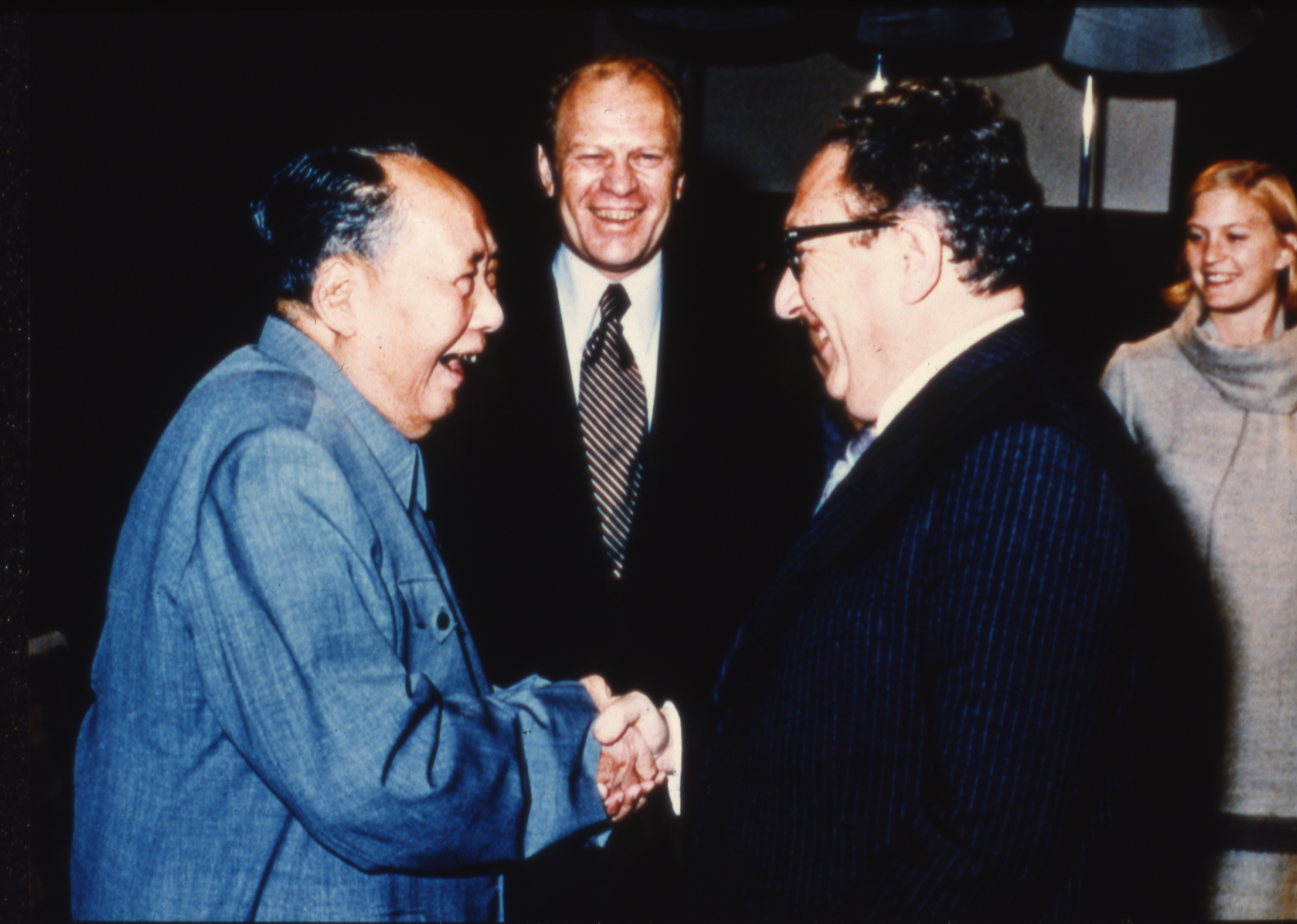
Secretary of State Henry Kissinger and President Gerald Ford with Chinese Communist Party chairman Mao Tse-tung in Beijing, 1975

Secretary of State Henry Kissinger and Prime Minister of the Netherlands Joop den Uyl at the Catshuis on 11 August 1976.

- Henry Kissinger (in office 1973–1977)

	Country	Locations	Details	Dates
1	Soviet Union	Moscow	Met with General Secretary Brezhnev to discuss the Middle East war.	October 20–22, 1973
1	Israel	Tel Aviv	Met with Prime Minister Meir to discuss the Middle East war.	October 22, 1973
1	United Kingdom	London	Met with Foreign Secretary Douglas-Home.	October 22, 1973
2	Morocco	Rabat	Met with King Hassan II and senior Moroccan officials.	November 5–6, 1973
2	Tunisia	Tunis	Stopped en route to Egypt.	November 6, 1973
2	Egypt	Cairo	Met with President Sadat; announced agreement to resume diplomatic relations.	November 6–7, 1973
2	Jordan	Amman	Met with King Hussein and senior Jordanian officials.	November 8, 1973
2	Saudi Arabia	Riyadh	Met with King Faisal and senior Saudi officials.	November 8–9, 1973
2	Iran	Tehran	Met with Shah Mohammed Reza Pahlavi.	November 9, 1973
2	Pakistan	Islamabad	Met with Prime Minister Bhutto and senior Pakistani officials.	November 10, 1973
2	China	Beijing	Met with CCP Chairman Mao Tse-tung, Premier Chou En-lai, and senior Chinese officials.	November 10–14, 1973
2	Japan	Tokyo	Chiefs of Mission to Asian countries.	November 14–16, 1973
2	South Korea	Seoul	Met with Premier Kim.	November 16, 1973
3	Belgium	Brussels	Attended NATO Ministerial Meeting.	December 8–11, 1973
3	United Kingdom	London	Attended a Chiefs of Mission conference.	December 12, 1973
3	Algeria	Algiers	Met with President Boumédiène and Foreign Affairs Minister Bouteflika.	December 13, 1973
3	Egypt	Cairo	Met with President Sadat to discuss Middle East peace negotiations.	December 14, 1973
3	Saudi Arabia	Riyadh	Met with King Faisal I to discuss the Middle East peace process.	December 14, 1973
3	Syria	Damascus	Met with President Assad to discuss the Middle East peace process.	December 15, 1973
3	Jordan	Amman, Rayak	Met with King Hussein to discuss the Middle East peace process.	December 15, 1973
3	Lebanon	Beirut	Met with President Frangieh and Premier Solh.	December 16–17, 1973
3	Israel	Jerusalem, Tel Aviv	Met with Prime Minister Meir to discuss the Middle East peace process.	December 17, 1973
3	Portugal	Lisbon	Official visit. Discussed bilateral relations with senior officials.	December 17–18, 1973
3	Spain	Madrid	Official visit. Discussed bilateral relations with senior officials.	December 18–19, 1973
3	France	Paris	Discussed the Vietnam situation with North Vietnamese negotiator Thọ	December 19–20, 1973
3	Switzerland	Geneva	Attended opening session of Middle East Peace Conference.	December 20–22, 1973
4	Spain	Madrid	Met with Foreign Minister Cortona while en route to Egypt.	January 11, 1974
4	Egypt	Aswan, Luxor	Negotiations leading to Egyptian–Israeli ("Kilometer 101") disengagement agreement. Was in Egypt January 11–12, 13–14, 16, and 18.	January 12–17, 1974
4	Israel	Tel Aviv, Jerusalem	Negotiations leading to Egyptian–Israeli ("Kilometer 101") disengagement agreement. Was in Israel January 12–13, 14–15, 16–17.	January 12–17, 1974
4	Jordan	Aqaba	Egyptian–Israeli disengagement agreement.	January 19–20, 1974
4	Syria	Damascus	Briefed President Assad on the Egyptian–Israeli disengagement agreement.	January 20, 1974
4	Israel	Tel Aviv, Jerusalem	Presented the Syrian position on military disengagement.	January 20, 1974
5	Panama	Panama City	Signed a statement of principles for negotiation of a new Panama Canal Treaty.	February 7, 1974
6	Mexico	Mexico City	Attended the Tlatelolco Conference of Latin American Foreign Ministers.	February 20–24, 1974
6	United Kingdom	London	Met with Prime Minister Heath and Foreign Secretary Douglas-Home en route to the Middle East.	February 25, 1974
6	Syria	Damascus	Met with haPresident Assad.	February 26, 1974
6	Israel	Jerusalem	Met with Prime Minister Meir.	February 27–28, 1974
6	Egypt	Cairo	Announced re-establishment of diplomatic relations.	February 28, 1974
7	Syria	Damascus	Presented an Israeli proposal for military disengagement to President Assad.	March 1–2, 1974
7	Saudi Arabia	Riyadh	Briefed King Faisal I on the Syrian–Israeli peace process.	March 2, 1974
7	Jordan	Amman	Briefed King Hussein on the Syrian–Israeli peace process.	March 2, 1974
7	West Germany	Bonn	Met with Chancellor Brandt and Foreign Minister Scheel.	March 3, 1974
7	Belgium	Brussels	Briefed NATO and EEC officials on the Middle East peace process.	March 4, 1974
8	West Germany	Bonn	Met with Chancellor Brandt and Foreign Minister Scheel.	March 24, 1974
8	Soviet Union	Moscow	Discussed preparations for the Moscow Summit.	March 24–28, 1974
8	United Kingdom	London	Met with Prime Minister Wilson and Foreign Minister Callaghan.	March 28, 1974
9	Mexico	Acapulco, Mexico City	Honeymoon. Also met with senior Mexican officials.	March 30 – April 9, 1974
10	Switzerland	Geneva	Met with Soviet Foreign Minister Gromyko to discuss bilateral relations.	April 28–29, 1974
10	Algeria	Algiers	Met with President Boumédiène en route to the Middle East.	April 29–30, 1974
10	Egypt	Alexandria	Discussed economic aid and the peace process with President Sadat.	April 30 – May 1, 1974
10	Israel	Tel Aviv	Discussed the peace process with Foreign Minister Eban.	May 2–3, 1974
10	Syria	Damascus	Shuttle negotiations leading to an Israeli–Syrian disengagement agreement. Kissinger was in Damascus May 3–4, 12, 14, 16–17, 18, 20, 21, 22, 23, 25, 26, 27, 28, and 29.	May 3–29, 1974
10	Israel	Jerusalem	Shuttle negotiations leading to an Israeli–Syrian disengagement agreement. Kissinger was in Jerusalem May 4–5, 6–7, 7–8, 8–9, 10–12, 12–14, 14–16, 17–18, 18–20, 21–22, 22–23, 23–25, 25–26, 27–28, and 29–30.	May 4–31, 1974
10	Jordan	Amman	Briefed King Hussein and Prime Minister Zaid Rifai on the Israeli–Syrian negotiations.	May 5–6, 1974
10	Cyprus	Nicosia	Met with Soviet Foreign Minister Gromyko to discuss Soviet-American relations and the Middle East situation.	May 7, 1974
10	Saudi Arabia	Riyadh	Briefed King Faisal and Foreign Minister Saqqaf on the Israeli–Syrian negotiations.	May 9, 1974
10	Egypt	Cairo	Briefed President Sadat on Israeli–Syrian negotiations. Also visited Cairo May 30.	May 9–10, 1974
11	Austria	Salzburg	Accompanied President Nixon.	June 10–11, 1974
11	West Germany	Bad Reichenhall	Met with Foreign Minister Genscher.	June 11, 1974
11	Egypt	Cairo, Alexandria	Accompanied President Nixon.	June 12–14, 1974
11	Saudi Arabia	Jeddah	Accompanied President Nixon.	June 14–15, 1974
11	Syria	Damascus	Accompanied President Nixon.	June 15–16, 1974
11	Israel	Tel Aviv, Jerusalem	Accompanied President Nixon.	June 16–17, 1974
11	Canada	Ottawa	Attended NATO Ministerial Meeting.	June 17–19, 1974
12	Belgium	Brussels	Accompanied President Nixon to a meeting of NATO Heads of Government.	June 25–26, 1974
12	Soviet Union	Moscow, Simferopol, Minsk	Accompanied President Nixon on an official visit.	June 27 – July 3, 1974
12	Belgium	Brussels	Briefed NATO officials on the U.S.-Soviet summit.	July 3–4, 1974
12	France	Paris	Briefed President Giscard d'Estaing and Foreign Minister Sauvagnargues on the U.S.-Soviet summit.	July 4–5, 1974
12	Italy	Rome	Briefed Prime Minister Rumor on the U.S.-Soviet summit.	July 5–6, 1974
12	Vatican City State	Vatican City	Audience with Pope Paul VI.	July 6, 1974
12	West Germany	Düsseldorf, Munich	Briefed Foreign Minister Federal Genscher on the U.S.-Soviet summit.	July 6–8, 1974
12	United Kingdom	London	Summit.	July 8–9, 1974
12	Spain	Madrid	Signed a Joint Declaration of Principles on security cooperation.	July 9, 1974
13	Egypt	Cairo	Reviewed the Middle East peace process with President Sadat and Foreign Minister Ismail Fahmy.	October 9–10, 1974
13	Syria	Damascus	Reviewed the Middle East peace process with President Assad.	October 11, 1974
13	Jordan	Amman, Aqaba	Reviewed the Middle East peace process with King Hussein and Prime Minister Rifai.	October 11–12, 1974
13	Israel	Tel Aviv	Reviewed the Middle East peace process with Prime Minister Rabin and Foreign Minister Allon.	October 12–13, 1974
13	Saudi Arabia	Riyadh	Reviewed the Middle East peace process with King Faisal and Foreign Minister Saqqaf.	October 13, 1974
13	Egypt	Cairo	Reviewed the Middle East peace process with President Sadat.	October 14, 1974
13	Syria	Damascus	Reviewed the Middle East peace process with President Assad.	October 14, 1974
13	Algeria	Algiers	Reviewed the Middle East peace process with President Boumédiène.	October 14–15, 1974
13	Morocco	Rabat	Reviewed bilateral relations and the Middle East peace process with King Hassan II.	October 15, 1974
14	Mexico	Nogales, Magdalena de Kino	Accompanied President Ford to a meeting with President Echeverría.	October 21, 1974
15	Denmark	Copenhagen	Stopped en route to Moscow.	October 23, 1974
15	Soviet Union	Moscow	Met with General Secretary Brezhnev, Foreign Minister Gromyko, and other Soviet officials.	October 23–27, 1974
15	India	New Delhi	Official visit. Signed an agreement establishing a U.S.-Indian Joint Commission.	October 27–30, 1974
15	Bangladesh	Dhaka	Met with Prime Minister Rahman and Foreign Minister Hossain.	October 30–31, 1974
15	Pakistan	Rawalpindi	Met with Prime Minister Bhutto.	October 31 – November 1, 1974
15	Afghanistan	Kabul	Official visit. Met with Prime Minister Daoud and senior Afghan officials.	November 1, 1974
15	Iran	Tehran	Met with Shah Mohammed Reza Pahlavi and senior Iranian officials. Established U.S.-Iran Joint Commission.	November 1–3, 1974
15	Romania	Bucharest	Official visit. Met with President Ceaușescu and Foreign Minister Mancovescu.	November 3–4, 1974
15	Yugoslavia	Belgrade	Official visit. Met with President Tito and senior Yugoslav officials.	November 4, 1974
15	Italy	Rome	Met with President Leone and Foreign Minister Moro. Addressed the World Food Conference November 5.	November 4–5, 1974
15	Egypt	Cairo	Discussed the Middle East peace process with President Sadat and Foreign Minister Fahmy.	November 5–6, 1974
15	Saudi Arabia	Riyadh	Discussed the Middle East peace process with King Faisal and Foreign Minister Saqqaf.	November 6, 1974
15	Jordan	Amman	Discussed the Middle East peace process with King Hussein and Prime Minister Rifai.	November 6–7, 1974
15	Syria	Damascus	Discussed the Middle East peace process with President Assad.	November 7, 1974
15	Israel	Jerusalem	Discussed the Middle East peace process with Prime Minister Rabin and Foreign Minister Allon.	November 7–8, 1974
15	Tunisia	Tunis	Discussed the Middle East peace process with President Bourguiba and Foreign Minister Chatti.	November 8–9, 1974
16	Japan	Tokyo	Accompanied President Ford on a State visit.	November 18–22, 1974
16	South Korea	Seoul	Accompanied President Ford.	November 22–23, 1974
16	Soviet Union	Vladivostok	Accompanied President Ford to a discussion on strategic arms limitations with General Secretary Brezhnev.	November 23–24, 1974
16	Japan	Tokyo	Met with Foreign Minister Kimura.	November 25, 1974
16	China	Beijing, Suzhou	Met with Foreign Minister Chiao.	November 25–29, 1974
17	Belgium	Brussels	Attended NATO Ministerial Meeting.	December 12–13, 1974
17	France	Martinique	Joined President Ford for a meeting with French President Giscard d'Estaing.	December 14–16, 1974
18	Israel	Jerusalem	Official visit. Discussed prospects for a second Egyptian–Israeli disengagement agreement.	February 10–12, 1975
18	Egypt	Cairo	Official visit. Discussed prospects for a second Egyptian–Israeli disengagement agreement.	February 12–13, 1975
18	Syria	Damascus	Briefed President Assad on the Middle East peace process.	February 13, 1975
18	Israel	Tel Aviv, Jerusalem	Official visit. Discussed prospects for a second Egyptian–Israeli disengagement agreement.	February 13–14, 1975
18	Jordan	Aqaba	Briefed King Hussein and Prime Minister Rifai on the Middle East peace process.	February 14, 1975
18	Saudi Arabia	Riyadh	Briefed King Faisal on the Middle East peace process.	February 15, 1975
18	West Germany	Bonn	Met with Foreign Minister Genscher.	February 15–16, 1975
18	Switzerland	Geneva	Met with Soviet Foreign Minister Gromyko.	February 16–17, 1975
18	United Kingdom	London	Met with Foreign Secretary Callaghan.	February 18, 1975
18	Switzerland	Zürich	Met with Shah Mohammed Reza Pahlavi of Iran.	February 18, 1975
18	France	Paris	Met with Foreign Minister Sauvagnargues.	February 18–19, 1975
19	United Kingdom	Cardiff	Attended a banquet in honor of Foreign Secretary Callaghan.	March 6, 1975
19	Belgium	Brussels	Discussed the Cyprus Question with Greek Foreign Minister Bitsios.	March 7, 1975
19	Egypt	Aswan	Discussed a further Egyptian–Israeli disengagement. Discussions continued in Aswan March 9, 12–14, and 17–18.	March 8–18, 1975
19	Syria	Damascus	Reviewed Middle East peace process with President Assad.	March 9, 1975
19	Israel	Tel Aviv, Jerusalem	Egyptian–Israeli disengagement. Discussions continued in Jerusalem March 9–10, 12, 14, 16–17, 18, and 20–23.	March 9–23, 1975
19	Turkey	Ankara	Met with Prime Minister Ecevit and senior Turkish officials.	March 10–11, 1975
19	Syria	Damascus	Briefed President Assad on the Egyptian–Israeli peace process	March 15, 1975
19	Jordan	Amman	Briefed King Hussein on the Middle East peace process.	March 15–16, 1975
19	Saudi Arabia	Riyadh	Met with King Faisal to review the Middle East peace process and bilateral relations.	March 19, 1975
20	Austria	Vienna	Met with Soviet Foreign Minister Gromyko regarding the Middle East.	May 18–20, 1975
20	West Germany	Bonn	Met with Chancellor Schmidt and Foreign Minister Genscher.	May 20–21, 1975
20	West Berlin	West Berlin	Met with City officials. Addressed the Berlin House of Representatives.	May 21, 1975
20	Turkey	Ankara	Attended CENTO Ministerial Meeting.	May 21–23, 1975
21	France	Paris	Attended the IEA and OECD Ministerial Meetings.	May 26–28, 1975
21	Belgium	Brussels	Accompanied President Ford to NATO Summit Meeting.	May 28–31, 1975
21	Spain	Madrid	Accompanied President Ford.	May 31 – June 1, 1975
21	Austria	Salzburg	Accompanied President Ford and met with Egyptian President Sadat.	June 1–3, 1975
21	Italy	Rome	Accompanied President Ford.	June 3, 1975
21	Vatican City State	Vatican City	Accompanied President Ford.	June 3, 1975
22	France	Paris	Met with President Giscard d'Estaing and Foreign Minister Sauvagnargues.	July 9–10, 1975
22	Switzerland	Geneva	Met with Soviet Foreign Minister Gromyko.	July 10–11, 1975
22	West Germany	Bonn	Met with West German officials and with Israeli Prime Minister Rabin.	July 11–12, 1975
22	United Kingdom	London	Met with Foreign Secretary Callaghan.	July 12, 1975
23	West Germany	Bonn	Accompanied President Ford.	July 26–28, 1975
23	Poland	Warsaw	Accompanied President Ford on an official visit.	July 28–29, 1975
23	Finland	Helsinki	Accompanied President Ford to the signing ceremony for the Final Act of the Conference on Security and Cooperation in Europe.	July 30 – August 1, 1975
23	Romania	Bucharest, Sinaia	Accompanied President Ford on an official visit.	August 2–3, 1975
23	Yugoslavia	Belgrade	Accompanied President Ford on an official visit.	August 3–4, 1975
24	Canada	Montreal	Addressed American Bar Association on international law.	August 11, 1975
25	Israel	Jerusalem	Negotiated a second Egyptian–Israeli disengagement agreement.	August 21–31, 1975
25	Egypt	Alexandria	Negotiated a second Egyptian–Israeli disengagement agreement. Negotiations continued in Alexandria August 23, 25, 28 and 31.	August 22–31, 1975
25	Syria	Damascus	Briefed President Assad on the Middle East peace process.	August 23, 1975
26	Israel	Jerusalem	Attended the signing of a second Egyptian–Israeli disengagement agreement.	September 1, 1975
26	Saudi Arabia	Taif	Briefed King Khalid on the Middle East peace process.	September 2, 1975
26	Jordan	Amman	Briefed King Hussein and Prime Minister Rifai on the Middle East peace process.	September 2, 1975
26	Syria	Damascus	Briefed President Assad on the Middle East peace process.	September 3, 1975
27	Canada	Ottawa	Met with Minister for External Affairs MacEachen.	October 14–15, 1975
28	Japan	Tokyo	Stopped en route to China.	October 18–19, 1975
28	China	Beijing	Met with CCP Chairman Mao Zedong and Foreign Minister Chiao.	October 19–23, 1975
28	Japan	Tokyo	Met with Prime Minister Miki and Foreign Minister Miyazawa.	October 23, 1975
29	France	Rambouillet	Accompanied President Ford to the first Economic Summit Meeting of the Heads of State and Government of France, West Germany, the United Kingdom, Italy, and Japan.	November 15–17, 1975
30	China	Beijing	Accompanied President Ford on an official visit.	December 1–5, 1975
30	Indonesia	Jakarta	Accompanied President Ford on an official visit.	December 5–6, 1975
30	Philippines	Manila	Accompanied President Ford on an official visit.	December 6–7, 1975
30	Japan	Tokyo	Met with Prime Minister Miki and Foreign Minister Miyazawa.	December 8, 1975
31	Belgium	Brussels	Attended NATO Ministerial Meeting.	December 11–12, 1975
31	West Germany	Fürth	Received the city's Gold Medal for Distinguished Native Citizens.	December 13–15, 1975
31	France	Paris	Attended the Conference on International Economic Cooperation.	December 15–17, 1975
32	Denmark	Copenhagen	Met with Prime Minister Jørgensen.	January 19–20, 1976
32	Soviet Union	Moscow	Discussed further limitations on strategic arms with General Secretary Brezhnev and Foreign Minister Gromyko.	January 21–23, 1976
32	Belgium	Brussels	Briefed NATO officials on U.S.-Soviet arms talks.	January 23, 1976
32	Spain	Madrid	Signed Treaty of Friendship and Cooperation.	January 24, 1976
33	Venezuela	Caracas	Met with President Pérez and Foreign Minister Escovar Salom.	February 16–18, 1976
33	Peru	Lima	Met with President Morales Bermúdez and Foreign Minister de la Flor.	February 18–19, 1976
33	Brazil	Brasília	Met with Foreign Minister Silveira. Signed a Memorandum of understanding.	February 19–21, 1976
33	Colombia	Bogotá	Met with President López Michelson and Foreign Minister Liévano Aguirre.	February 22–23, 1976
33	Costa Rica	San José	Met with President Oduber, Foreign Minister Facio, and with Central American Foreign Ministers.	February 23–24, 1976
33	Guatemala	Guatemala City	Discussed disaster relief assistance with President Laugerud García and senior Guatemalan officials.	February 24, 1976
34	United Kingdom	Waddington	Met with Foreign Secretary Crosland.	April 23, 1976
34	Kenya	Nairobi	Met with President Kenyatta and Foreign Affairs Minister Waiyaki.	April 24–25, 1976
34	Tanzania	Dar es Salaam	Met with President Nyerere and Foreign Minister Kaduma.	April 25–26, 1976
34	Zambia	Lusaka	Met with President Kaunda and Foreign Minister Banda.	April 26, 1976
34	Zaire	Kinshasa	Met with President Mobutu and Commissioner Nguza.	April 27–29, 1976
34	Liberia	Monrovia	Met with President Tolbert.	April 30 – May 1, 1976
34	Senegal	Dakar	Met with President Leopold Senghor and Foreign Affairs Minister Seck.	May 2, 1976
34	Kenya	Nairobi	Attended an UNCTAD Conference.	May 3–6, 1976
34	France	Paris	Met with President Giscard d'Estaing and with President Houphouët-Boigny of the Ivory Coast.	May 7, 1976
35	Norway	Oslo	Attended NATO Ministerial Meeting.	May 20–22, 1976
35	West Germany	Bonn	Met with Chancellor Schmidt and Foreign Minister Genscher.	May 23, 1976
35	Sweden	Stockholm	Met with Prime Minister Palme and Foreign Minister Andersson.	May 23–25, 1976
35	Luxembourg	Luxembourg	Met with Prime Minister Thorn.	May 25, 1976
35	United Kingdom	London	Attended CENTO Council of Ministers meeting.	May 25–27, 1976
36	Dominican Republic	Santo Domingo	Met with President Balaguer and senior Dominican officials.	June 6, 1976
36	Bolivia	Santa Cruz	Met with President Banzer and Foreign Affairs Minister Adriázola.	June 6–7, 1976
36	Chile	Santiago	Attended OAS General Assembly Meeting.	June 7–9, 1976
36	Mexico	Mexico City	Met with President Echeverría and senior Mexican officials.	June 10–13, 1976
37	France	Paris	Attended an OECD Meeting.	June 20–22, 1976
37	West Germany	Bodenmais, Grafenau	Met with Foreign Minister Genscher and South African Prime Minister Vorster.	June 23–24, 1976
37	United Kingdom	London	Met with Prime Minister Callaghan and Foreign Secretary Crosland.	June 24–25, 1976
38	United Kingdom	London	Met with Prime Minister Callaghan and Foreign Secretary Crosland.	August 4, 1976
38	Iran	Tehran	Attended a meeting of the U.S.-Iran Joint Commission.	August 6–7, 1976
38	Afghanistan	Kabul	Official visit. Met with Prime Minister Daoud and senior Afghan officials.	August 8, 1976
38	Pakistan	Lahore	Met with Prime Minister Bhutto.	August 8–9, 1976
38	France	Deauville	Vacation.	August 9–11, 1976
38	Netherlands	The Hague	Met with Prime Minister den Uyl and Foreign Minister van der Stoel.	August 11, 1976
39	United Kingdom	London	Discussed Rhodesia and Namibia with Foreign Secretary Crosland.	September 3–4, 1976
39	Switzerland	Zürich	Met with South African Prime Minister Vorster.	September 4–7, 1976
39	France	Paris	Discussed Southern African issues with President Giscard d'Estaing and senior French officials.	September 7, 1976
39	West Germany	Hamburg	Met with Chancellor Schmidt and Foreign Minister Genscher.	September 7, 1976
40	Tanzania	Dar es Salaam	Discussed Rhodesia and Namibia with President Nyerere.	September 14–15, 1976
40	Zambia	Lusaka	Discussed Rhodesia and Namibia with President Kaunda.	September 15–17, 1976
40	South Africa	Pretoria	Discussed Rhodesia and Namibia with Prime Minister Vorster. Met with a Rhodesian delegation.	September 17–20, 1976
40	Tanzania	Dar es Salaam	Briefed President Nyerere on meetings with Rhodesian leaders.	September 21, 1976
40	Zaire	Kinshasa	Discussed regional and bilateral issues with President Mobutu.	September 21–22, 1976
40	Kenya	Nairobi	Discussed Rhodesia and Namibia with President Kenyatta and Acting Foreign Minister Osogo.	September 22–23, 1976
40	United Kingdom	London	Discussed Rhodesia and Namibia with Foreign Secretary Crosland.	September 23–24, 1976
41	Mexico	Mexico City	Attended the inauguration of President López Portillo.	November 29 – December 2, 1976
42	Belgium	Brussels	Attended NATO Ministerial Meeting.	December 7–10, 1976
42	United Kingdom	London	Discussed Rhodesia with Foreign Secretary Crosland.	December 10–12, 1976

== Cyrus Vance ==
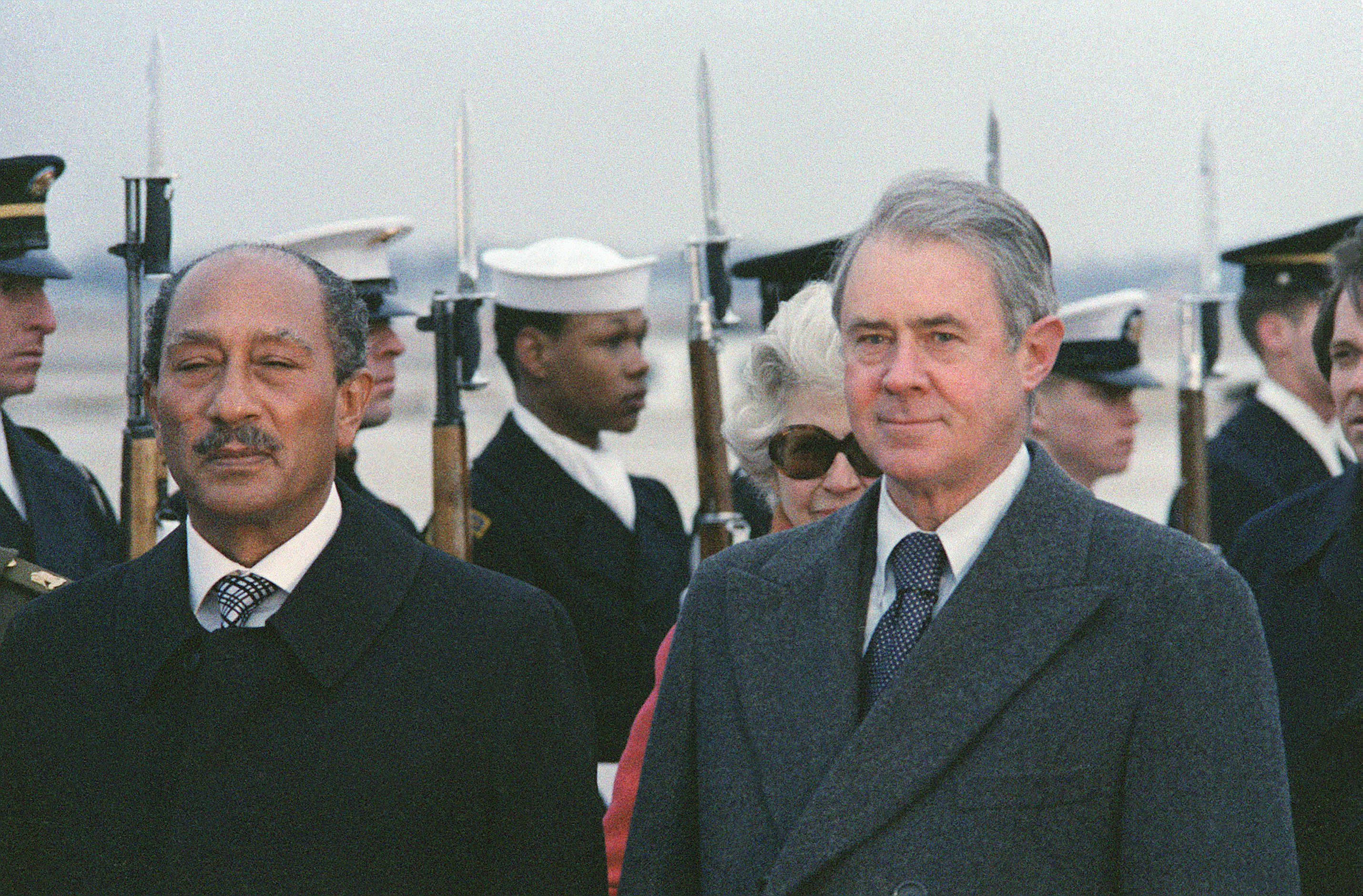
President Anwar Sadat of Egypt and Secretary of State Cyrus Vance

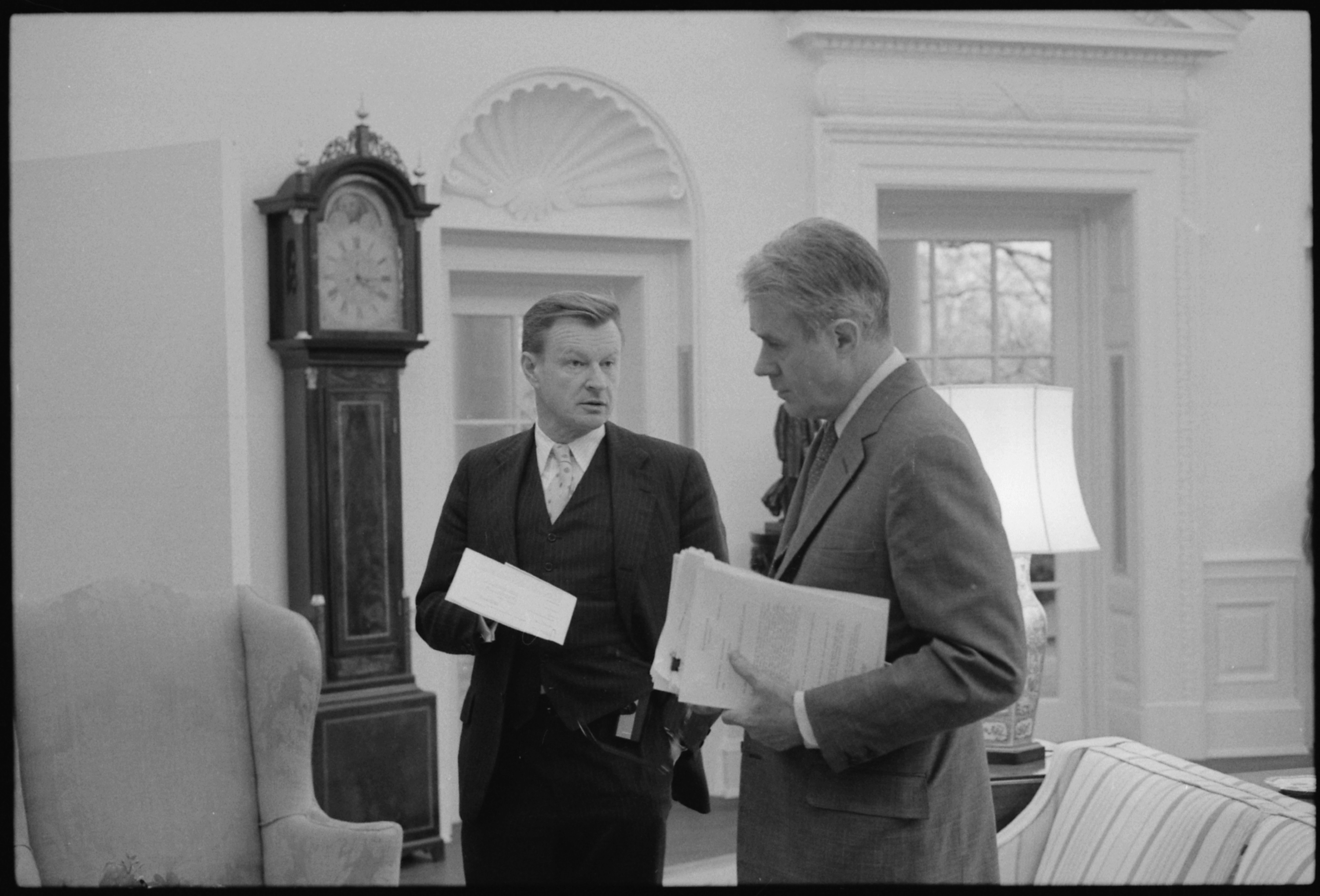
National Security Advisor Zbigniew Brzezinski and Secretary of State Cyrus Vance

- Cyrus Vance (in office 1977–1980)

	Country	Locations	Details	Dates
1	Israel	Jerusalem	Met with Prime Minister Rabin and Foreign Minister Allon; reviewed the Middle East peace process.	February 15–17, 1977
1	Egypt	Cairo	Met with President Sadat and Foreign Minister Fahmy; reviewed the Middle East peace process.	February 17–18, 1977
1	Lebanon	Beirut	Met with President Sarkis and senior Lebanese officials.	February 18, 1977
1	Jordan	Amman	Met with King Hussein; reviewed the Middle East peace process.	February 18–19, 1977
1	Saudi Arabia	Riyadh	Met with Crown Prince Fahd and Foreign Minister Prince Saud; reviewed the Middle East peace process.	February 19–20, 1977
1	Syria	Damascus	Met with President Assad; reviewed the Middle East peace process.	February 20–21, 1977
2	Belgium	Brussels	Attended a special session of the North Atlantic Council.	March 26, 1977
2	Soviet Union	Moscow	Presented arms reduction proposal to General Secretary Brezhnev and Foreign Minister Gromyko.	March 27–30, 1977
2	West Germany	Bonn	Briefed Chancellor Schmidt and Foreign Minister Genscher on meetings with Soviet leaders.	March 31, 1977
2	United Kingdom	London	Briefed Prime Minister Callaghan on meetings with Soviet leaders.	April 1, 1977
2	France	Paris	Briefed President Giscard d'Estaing and senior French officials on meetings with Soviet leaders.	April 1, 1977
3	United Kingdom	London	Accompanied President Carter to Economic Summit Meeting. Attended NATO Ministerial Meeting (May 10–11). Met May 11 with Israeli Foreign Minister Allon.	May 5–11, 1977
3	Switzerland	Geneva	Accompanied President Carter to a meeting with Syrian President Assad.	May 9, 1977
3	Spain	Madrid	Attended the first regular session of the U.S.-Spanish Council.	May 11–12, 1977
3	Iran	Tehran	Attended CENTO Ministerial Meeting.	May 12–15, 1977
4	Switzerland	Geneva	Met with Soviet Foreign Minister Gromyko. Signed Convention on the Prohibition of Military or Any Other Hostile Use of Environmental Modification Techniques.	May 18–21, 1977
5	France	Paris	Attended the Conference on International Economic Development.	May 28 – June 2, 1977
6	Grenada	St. George's	Attended OAS General Assembly Meeting.	June 14–16, 1977
6	Trinidad and Tobago	Port of Spain	Met with President Clarke and Prime Minister Williams.	June 16–17, 1977
7	France	Paris	Attended OECD Ministerial Meeting.	June 22–24, 1977
8	Egypt	Alexandria	Met with President Sadat; discussed the Middle East peace process. Revisited.	August 1–3, 1977
8	Lebanon	Beirut	Met with President Sarkis and senior Lebanese officials; reviewed the Middle East peace process.	August 3, 1977
8	Syria	Damascus	Reviewed the Middle East peace process with President Assad. Revisited Syria August 11.	August 3–5, 1977
8	Jordan	Amman	Reviewed the Middle East peace process with King Hussein. Revisited Jordan August 11.	August 5–7, 1977
8	Saudi Arabia	Taif	Reviewed the Middle East peace process with King Khalid and senior Saudi officials.	August 7–9, 1977
8	Israel	Jerusalem	Reviewed the Middle East peace process with Prime Minister Begin and Foreign Minister Dayan.	August 9–11, 1977
8	United Kingdom	London	Discussed Rhodesia with Foreign Secretary Owen.	August 11–13, 1977
9	China	Beijing	Met with CCP Chairman Hua Guofeng, Foreign Minister Huang, and senior Chinese officials.	August 20–26, 1977
9	Japan	Tokyo	Met with Prime Minister Fukuda and Foreign Minister Hatoyama.	August 26–27, 1977
10	Argentina	Buenos Aires	Met with President Videla and senior Argentinian officials.	November 20–22, 1977
10	Brazil	Brasília	Met with President Geisel and senior Brazilian officials.	November 22–23, 1977
10	Venezuela	Caracas	Met with President Pérez and senior Venezuelan officials.	November 23, 1977
11	Belgium	Brussels	Attended NATO Ministerial Meeting.	December 8–9, 1977
11	Egypt	Cairo	Reviewed the Middle East peace process	December 9–10, 1977
11	Israel	Jerusalem	Reviewed the Middle East peace process	December 10–12, 1977
11	Jordan	Amman	Reviewed the Middle East peace process	December 12–13, 1977
11	Lebanon	Beirut	Reviewed the Middle East peace process	December 13, 1977
11	Syria	Damascus	Reviewed the Middle East peace process	December 13–14, 1977
11	Saudi Arabia	Riyadh	Reviewed the Middle East peace process	December 14–15, 1977
12	Poland	Warsaw	Accompanied President Carter on an official visit.	December 29–31, 1977
12	Iran	Tehran	Accompanied President Carter on an official visit.	December 31, 1977 – January 1, 1978
12	India	New Delhi	Accompanied President Carter.	January 1–3, 1978
12	Saudi Arabia	Riyadh	Accompanied President Carter.	January 3–4, 1978
12	Egypt	Aswan	Accompanied President Carter.	January 4, 1978
12	France	Paris	Accompanied President Carter.	January 4–6, 1978
12	Hungary	Budapest	Returned the Crown of St. Stephen to Hungary.	January 5–7, 1978
12	Ireland	Shannon	Met with Foreign Minister O'Kennedy while returning to U.S.	January 7, 1978
13	Israel	Jerusalem	Attended the opening session of the Egyptian-Israeli Political Committee.	January 16–20, 1978
13	Egypt	Cairo	Met with President Sadat regarding the peace process.	January 20, 1978
13	Turkey	Ankara	Met with Prime Minister Ecevit and senior Turkish officials.	January 20–21, 1978
13	Greece	Athens	Met with Prime Minister Karamanlis and senior Greek officials.	January 21–22, 1978
14	Venezuela	Caracas	Accompanied President Carter.	March 28–29, 1978
14	Brazil	Brasília, Rio de Janeiro	Accompanied President Carter on an official visit.	March 29–31, 1978
14	Nigeria	Lagos	Accompanied President Carter on a State visit.	March 31 – April 3, 1978
14	Liberia	Monrovia	Accompanied President Carter.	April 3, 1978
15	Sudan	Khartum	Met with Foreign Minister al-Tahir.	April 13, 1978
15	Tanzania	Dar es Salaam	Discussed the Rhodesian question with British Foreign Secretary Owen and leaders of Zimbabwe's Patriotic Front.	April 13–16, 1978
15	South Africa	Pretoria	Discussed Rhodesia and Namibia with Foreign Minister Botha and British Foreign Secretary Owen.	April 16–17, 1978
15	Zimbabwe-Rhodesia	Salisbury	Discussed the Rhodesian question with members of the Transitional government and British Foreign Secretary Owen.	April 17, 1978
15	United Kingdom	London	Attended CENTO Ministerial Meeting.	April 18–19, 1978
15	Soviet Union	Moscow	Met with General Secretary Brezhnev and Foreign Minister Gromyko.	April 19–23, 1978
16	Mexico	Mexico City, Puerto Vallarta	Official visit. Met with President López Portillo and Foreign Relations Secretary Roel.	May 3–5, 1978
17	France	Paris	Attended OECD Ministerial Meeting.	June 13–15, 1978
17	United Kingdom	London	Attended a meeting of U.S. Chiefs of Mission.	June 16–17, 1978
18	Switzerland	Geneva	Met with Soviet Foreign Minister Gromyko.	July 11–13, 1978
18	West Germany	Frankfurt, Bonn	Accompanied President Carter on a State visit and to the Economic Summit Meeting.	July 14–17, 1978
18	West Berlin	West Berlin	Accompanied President Carter.	July 15, 1978
18	United Kingdom	London, Hollingbourne	Discussed the Rhodesia question with Foreign Secretary Owen. Also met with the Egyptian and Israeli Foreign Ministers at Leeds Castle, July 18.	July 17–20, 1978
19	Israel	Jerusalem	Met with Prime Minister Begin and delivered an invitation to meet with President Carter and President Sadat at Camp David.	August 5–7, 1978
19	Egypt	Alexandria	Met with President Sadat and delivered an invitation to meet with President Carter and Prime Minister Begin at Camp David.	August 7–9, 1978
20	Dominican Republic	Santo Domingo	Attended the inauguration of President Guzmán.	August 16, 1978
21	Jordan	Amman	Reviewed the Camp David Accords with King Hussein.	September 20–21, 1978
21	Saudi Arabia	Riyadh	Reviewed the Camp David Accords with King Khalid and Crown Prince Fahd.	September 21–24, 1978
21	Syria	Damascus	Reviewed the Camp David Accords with President Assad.	September 24, 1978
22	South Africa	Pretoria	Discussed the Namibian question with South African officials.	October 14–18, 1978
22	Switzerland	Geneva	Met with the U.S. delegation prior to SALT negotiations in Moscow.	October 19–21, 1978
22	Soviet Union	Moscow	Discussed SALT negotiations with General Secretary Brezhnev and Foreign Minister Gromyko.	October 21–24, 1978
23	Canada	Ottawa	Signed the Great Lakes Water Quality Agreement.	November 21–22, 1978
24	United Kingdom	London	Addressed the Royal Institute for International Affairs.	December 9–10, 1978
24	Egypt	Cairo	Discussed the Egyptian-Israeli peace process. Visited Cairo December 10–11, 12–13, and 14–15.	December 10–15, 1978
24	Israel	Tel Aviv, Jerusalem	Discussed the Egyptian-Israeli peace process and attended the funeral of former Prime Minister Meir.	December 11–12, 1978
24	Israel	Tel Aviv	Discussed the Egyptian-Israeli peace process.	December 13–14, 1978
25	Switzerland	Geneva	Held SALT negotiations with Soviet Foreign Minister Gromyko.	December 21–23, 1978
25	Belgium	Brussels	Met with the Egyptian and Israeli Foreign Ministers.	December 23–24, 1978
26	Mexico	Mexico City	Accompanied President Carter on a State visit.	February 14–16, 1979
27	Egypt	Cairo, Alexandria	Accompanied President Carter on a State visit.	March 7–10, 1979
27	Israel	Jerusalem	Accompanied President Carter on a State visit.	March 10–13, 1979
27	Egypt	Cairo	Accompanied President Carter during final Egyptian-Israeli peace negotiations.	March 13, 1979
28	United Kingdom	London	Met with Prime Minister Thatcher and Foreign Secretary Lord Carrington. Also met with Israeli Prime Minister Begin May 24.	May 20–24, 1979
28	Egypt	Cairo	Met with President Sadat.	May 24, 1979
28	Israel	Tel Aviv, Beersheba, El Arish	Attended opening session of Egyptian-Israeli autonomy talks on the West Bank and Gaza at Beersheva, and the exchange of ratifications of the Egyptian-Israeli Peace Treaty.	May 25–27, 1979
28	Italy	Rome	Met with President Pertini and Prime Minister Andreotti.	May 27–29, 1979
28	Vatican City State	Vatican City	Audience with Pope John Paul II.	May 29, 1979
28	Netherlands	The Hague	Attended NATO Ministerial Meeting.	May 29–31, 1979
28	Spain	Madrid	Attended a meeting of the U.S.-Spanish Council.	June 1–2, 1979
29	Austria	Vienna	Accompanied President Carter to U.S.-Soviet Summit and the signing of the SALT II Treaty.	June 14–18, 1979
29	Portugal	Lisbon	Signed Lajes Base Agreement.	June 19, 1979
30	Japan	Tokyo	Accompanied President Carter on a State visit and to the Economic Summit Meeting.	June 25–29, 1979
30	South Korea	Seoul	Accompanied President Carter on a State visit.	June 30 – July 1, 1979
30	Indonesia	Bali	Attended meeting of ASEAN Foreign Ministers.	July 1–3, 1979
30	Australia	Canberra	Attended ANZUS Council Meeting.	July 3–5, 1979
31	Ecuador	Quito	Attended the inauguration of President Roldós.	August 9–12, 1979
31	Bolivia	La Paz	Attended OAS General Assembly Meeting.	October 20–23, 1979
32	South Korea	Seoul	Attended the funeral of President Park.	November 1–4, 1979
33	United Kingdom	London	Discussed international responses to the Iranian hostage crisis with Prime Minister Thatcher and Foreign Secretary Lord Carrington.	December 10, 1979
33	France	Paris	Discussed international responses to the Iranian hostage crisis with President Giscard d'Estaing and Foreign Minister François-Poncet. Also met with Japanese Foreign Minister Okita.	December 10–11, 1979
33	Italy	Rome	Discussed international responses to the Iranian hostage crisis with President Pertini and Prime Minister Cossiga.	December 11, 1979
33	West Germany	Bonn	Discussed international responses to the Iranian hostage crisis with Chancellor Schmidt and Foreign Minister Genscher.	December 11–12, 1979
33	Belgium	Brussels	Attended NATO Ministerial Meeting and a special meeting of NATO Foreign and Defense Ministers.	December 12–14, 1979
34	West Germany	Bonn	Discussed responses to Soviet invasion of Afghanistan with Chancellor Schmidt and Foreign Minister Genscher.	February 19–20, 1980
34	Italy	Rome	Discussed responses to Soviet invasion of Afghanistan with President Pertini and Foreign Minister Ruffini.	February 20–21, 1980
34	France	Paris	Discussed responses to Soviet invasion of Afghanistan with Foreign Minister François-Poncet.	February 21, 1980
34	United Kingdom	London	Discussed responses to Soviet invasion of Afghanistan with Foreign Secretary Lord Carrington.	February 21–22, 1980
35	Canada	Ottawa	Signed a nuclear cooperation agreement.	April 23, 1980

== Edmund Muskie ==
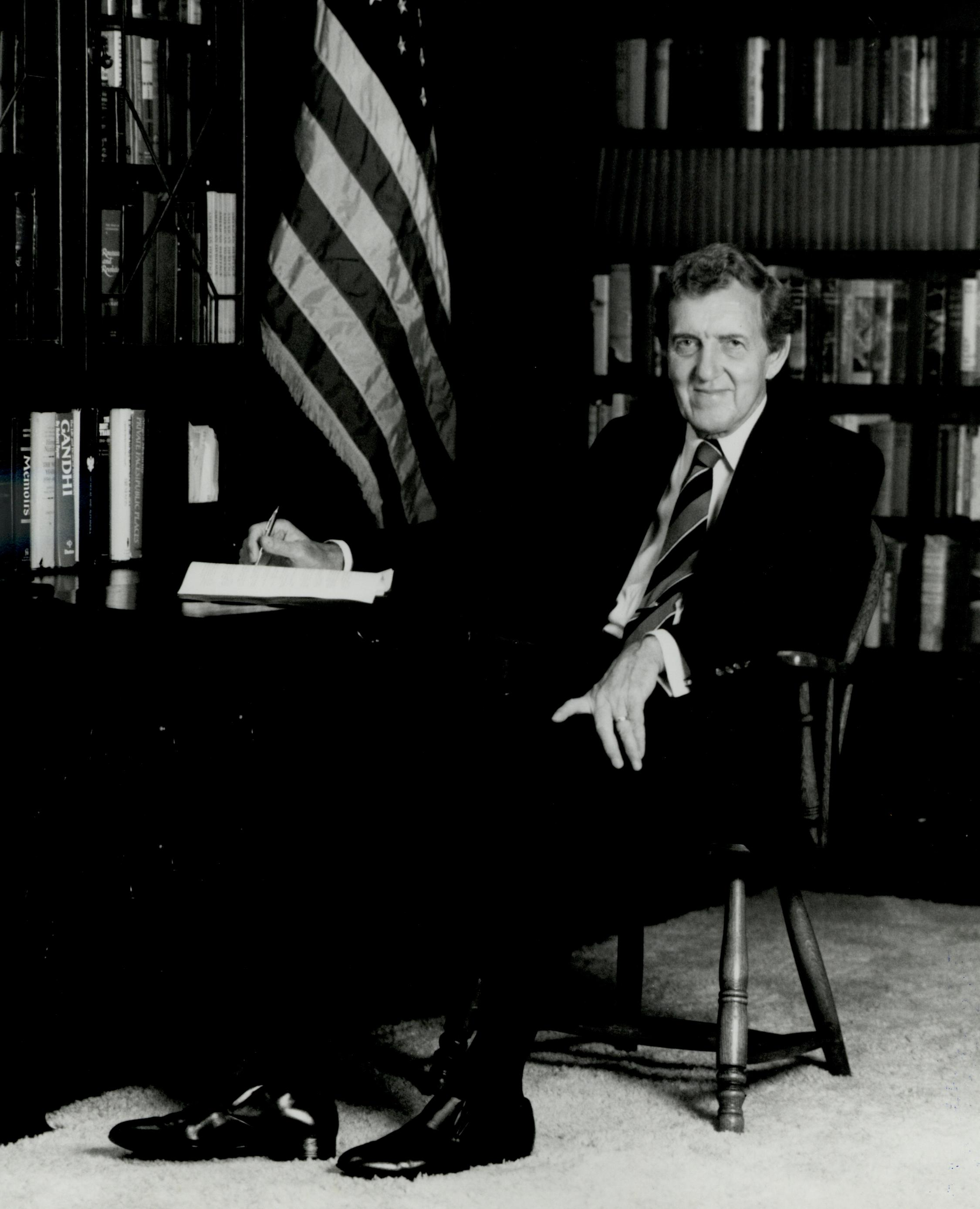
Secretary of State Edmund Sixtus Muskie

- Edmund Muskie (in office 1980–1981)

	Country	Locations	Details	Dates
1	Belgium	Brussels	Attended NATO Defense Planning Committee meeting.	May 13–15, 1980
1	Austria	Vienna	Attended ceremonies for the 25th anniversary of the Austrian State Treaty and met with Soviet Foreign Minister Gromyko.	May 15–16, 1980
2	Italy	Rome, Venice	Accompanied President Carter on a State visit and to Economic Summit Meeting.	June 19–24, 1980
2	Vatican City State	Vatican City	Accompanied President Carter.	June 21, 1980
2	Turkey	Ankara	Attended NATO Ministerial Meeting.	June 25–26, 1980
2	Malaysia	Kuala Lumpur	Met with ASEAN Foreign Ministers.	June 27–29, 1980
3	Japan	Tokyo	Accompanied President Carter to funeral of Prime Minister Ōhira. Met with Chinese Premier Hua Guofeng.	July 9–10, 1980
4	Mexico	Mexico City	Official visit. Reviewed work of U.S.-Mexico Consultative Mechanism.	November 29 – December 1, 1980
5	Belgium	Brussels	Attended NATO Ministerial Meeting.	December 10–12, 1980
5	United Kingdom	London	Met with Prime Minister Thatcher and Foreign Secretary Lord Carrington	December 12–14, 1980

== Alexander Haig ==
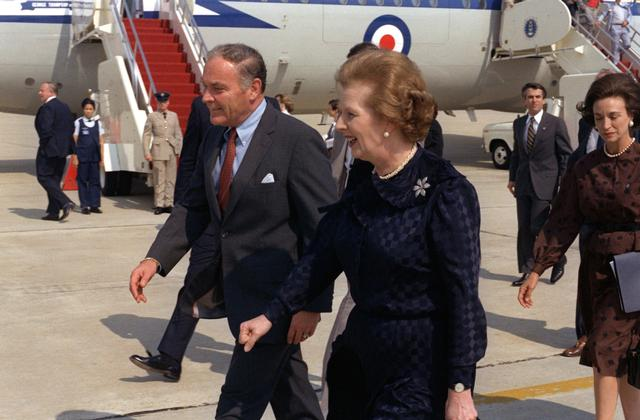
Secretary Alexander Haig welcoming British Prime Minister Margaret Thatcher to the United States

- Alexander Haig (in office 1981–1982)

	Country	Locations	Details	Dates
1	Canada	Ottawa	Accompanied President Reagan on a State visit.	March 10–11, 1981
2	Egypt	Cairo	Reviewed the Middle East peace process with President Sadat and Foreign Minister Kamal Hassan Ali.	April 4–5, 1981
2	Israel	Jerusalem	Reviewed the Middle East peace process with Prime Minister Begin and Foreign Minister Shamir.	April 5–6, 1981
2	Jordan	Amman	Reviewed the Middle East peace process with King Hussein and Prime Minister Rifai.	April 6–7, 1981
2	Saudi Arabia	Riyadh	Discussed the Middle East peace process and AWACS sales with King Fahd and Foreign Minister Prince Saud.	April 7–8, 1981
2	Italy	Rome	Met with Foreign Minister Colombo.	April 8, 1981
2	Spain	Madrid	Met with King Juan Carlos I, Prime Minister Calvo-Sotelo and senior Spanish officials.	April 8–9, 1981
2	United Kingdom	London	Met with Prime Minister Thatcher and Foreign Secretary Lord Carrington.	April 9–11, 1981
2	France	Paris	Met with President Giscard d'Estaing and Foreign Minister François-Poncet.	April 11, 1981
2	West Germany	Bonn	Met with Chancellor Schmidt and Foreign Minister Genscher.	April 12, 1981
3	Italy	Rome	Attended NATO Ministerial Meeting.	May 2–5, 1981
3	Belgium	Brussels	Stopped en route to U.S. from NATO meeting.	May 5, 1981
4	Hong Kong	Hong Kong	Official visit. Stopped en route to China.	June 12–14, 1981
4	China	Beijing	Met with CCP Chairman Hua Guofeng, Premier Zhao Ziyang, and senior Chinese officials.	June 14–17, 1981
4	Philippines	Manila	Attended ASEAN Foreign Ministers Meeting.	June 17–20, 1981
4	New Zealand	Wellington	Attended ANZUS Council Meeting.	June 21–23, 1981
5	Bahamas	Nassau	Attended a meeting with the Canadian, Mexican, and Venezuelan Foreign Ministers on economic cooperation in the Caribbean.	July 10–11, 1981
6	Canada	Ottawa, Montebello	Accompanied President Reagan to Economic Summit Meeting.	July 19–21, 1981
7	Mexico	Cancún	Attended a Foreign Ministers meeting preliminary to Conference on Cooperation and Development.	July 31 – August 2, 1981
8	Spain	Marbella	Met with Saudi Arabian Crown Prince Fahd.	September 11–12, 1981
8	Yugoslavia	Belgrade	Official visit; met with President Kraigher and senior Yugoslav officials.	September 12–13, 1981
8	Germany	West Berlin	Addressed the Berlin Press Association.	September 13, 1981
8	West Germany	Bonn	Met with Foreign Minister Genscher.	September 13–14, 1981
9	Egypt	Cairo	Attended the funeral of President Sadat.	October 9–12, 1981
10	Mexico	Cancún	Accompanied President Reagan to the International Meeting on Cooperation and Development.	October 21–24, 1981
11	Mexico	Mexico City	Deposited the instrument of ratification of the Treaty for the Prohibition of Nuclear Weapons in Latin America.	November 23–24, 1981
12	Saint Lucia	Castries	Attended OAS General Assembly Meeting.	December 2–4, 1981
13	Belgium	Brussels	Attended NATO Ministerial Meeting.	December 9–13, 1981
14	Belgium	Brussels	Attended a special NATO Ministerial meeting on the situation in Poland.	January 10–12, 1982
14	Egypt	Cairo	Discussed the Egyptian–Israeli peace process with President Mubarak.	January 12–14, 1982
14	Israel	Jerusalem	Discussed the Egyptian–Israeli peace process with Prime Minister Begin.	January 14–15, 1982
15	Switzerland	Geneva	Met with Soviet Foreign Minister Gromyko.	January 24–27, 1982
15	Israel	Jerusalem	Discussed prospects for Palestinian autonomy talks with Israeli officials.	January 27–28, 1982
15	Egypt	Cairo	Discussed prospects for Palestinian autonomy talks with Egyptian officials.	January 28–29, 1982
15	United Kingdom	London	Met with Prime Minister Thatcher while returning to U.S.	January 29, 1982
16	Spain	Madrid	Attended CSCE Follow-up Meeting.	February 7–10, 1982
16	Portugal	Lisbon	Met with Prime Minister Pinto and senior Portuguese officials.	February 10–11, 1982
16	Morocco	Marrakesh	Met with King Hassan II and senior Moroccan officials.	February 11–12, 1982
16	Romania	Bucharest	Met with President Ceaușescu and Foreign Minister Andrei.	February 12–13, 1982
17	United Kingdom	London	Attempted to resolve the Falkland Islands crisis.	April 8–9, 1982
17	Senegal	Dakar	Stopover way from London to Buenos Aires	April 9, 1982
17	Argentina	Buenos Aires	Attempted to resolve the Falkland crisis.	April 9–11, 1982
17	United Kingdom	London	Attempted to resolve the Falkland crisis.	April 12–13, 1982
17	Argentina	Buenos Aires	Attempted to resolve the Falkland crisis.	April 15–19, 1982
17	Venezuela	Caracas	Discussed the Falkland crisis with Foreign Minister Zambrano.	April 19, 1982
18	Turkey	Ankara	Official visit. Met with President Evren and senior Turkish officials.	May 13–15, 1982
18	Greece	Athens	Official visit. Met with President Karamanlis, Prime Minister Papandreou, and senior Greek officials.	May 15–16, 1982
18	Luxembourg	Luxembourg	Attended NATO Ministerial Meeting.	May 16–18, 1982
19	France	Paris, Versailles	Accompanied President Reagan on State visit and to Economic Summit Meeting.	June 2–7, 1982
19	Italy	Rome	Accompanied President Reagan on a State visit.	June 7, 1982
19	Vatican City State	Vatican City	Accompanied President Reagan.	June 7, 1982
19	United Kingdom	London	Accompanied President Reagan on a State visit.	June 7–9, 1982
19	West Germany	Bonn	Accompanied President Reagan on a State visit and to a NATO Summit Meeting.	June 9–11, 1982
19	Germany	West Berlin	Accompanied President Reagan.	June 11, 1982

== George Shultz ==
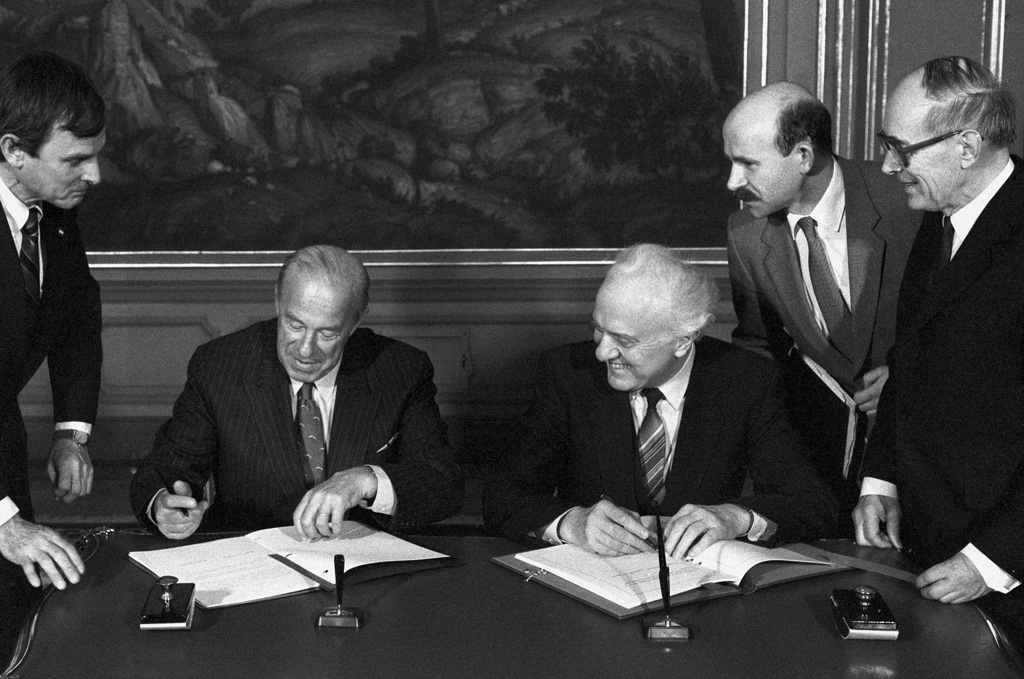
Secretary of State George Shultz with Soviet Foreign Minister Eduard Shevardnadze on signing ceremony in Moscow, 1987

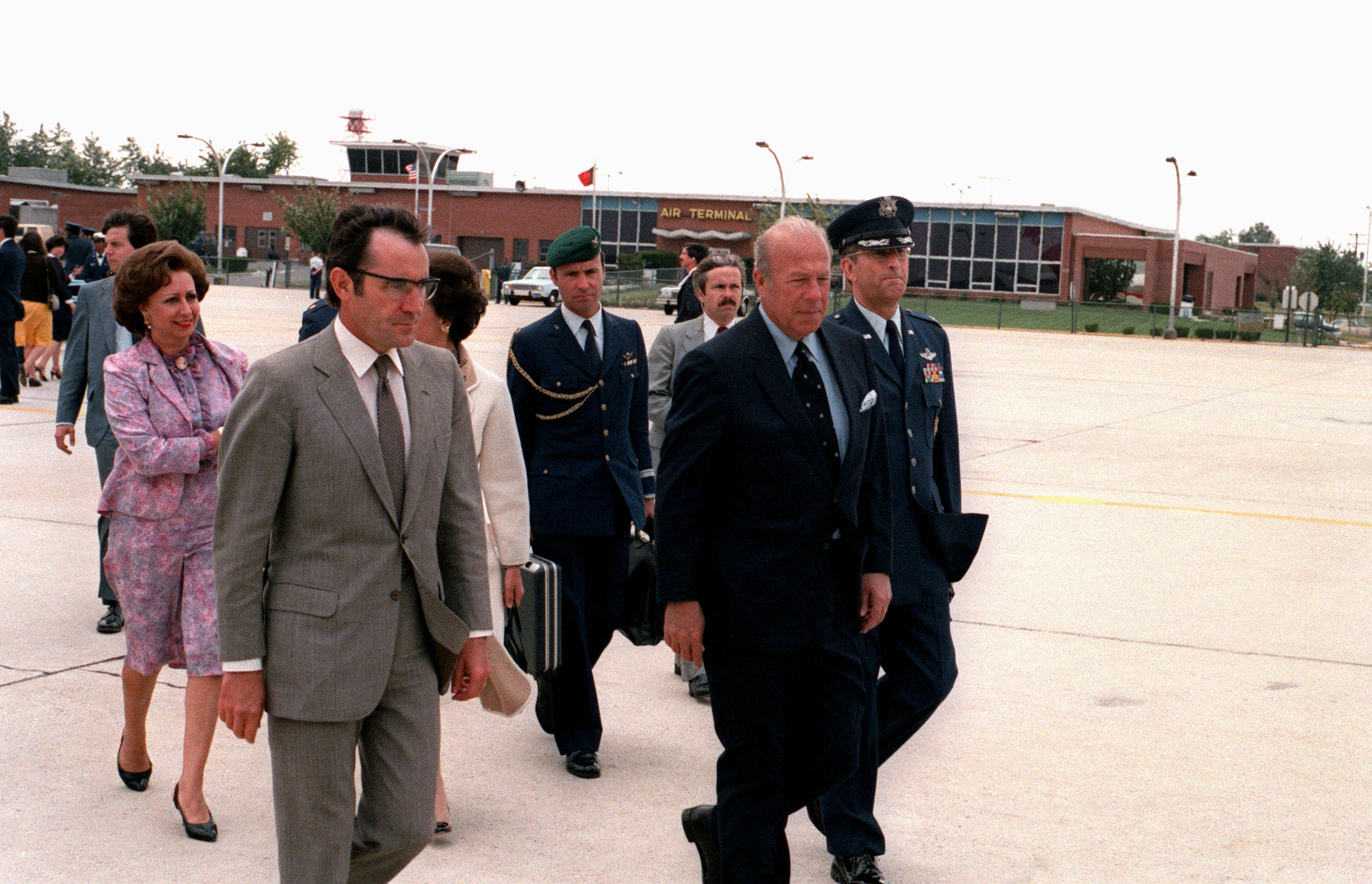
Secretary of State George Schultz with Portuguese President António dos Santos Ramalho Eanes

- George Shultz (in office 1982–1989)

	Country	Locations	Details	Dates
1	Canada	Shawinigan	Attended NATO Ministerial Meeting.	October 2–3, 1982
2	Mexico	Tijuana	Accompanied President Reagan to a meeting with President-elect De la Madrid.	October 9, 1982
3	Canada	Ottawa	Met with Minister for External Affairs MacEachen.	October 24–25, 1982
4	Brazil	Brasília, São Paulo	Accompanied President Reagan on an official working visit.	November 30 – December 3, 1982
4	Colombia	Bogotá	Accompanied President Reagan on an official working visit.	December 3, 1982
4	Costa Rica	San José	Accompanied President Reagan on an official working visit.	December 3–4, 1982
4	Honduras	San Pedro Sula	Accompanied President Reagan on an official working visit.	December 4, 1982
5	West Germany	Bonn	Met with Chancellor Kohl and Foreign Minister Genscher.	December 7–9, 1982
5	Belgium	Brussels	Attended NATO Ministerial Meeting and met with European Economic Community officials.	December 8–11, 1982
5	Netherlands	The Hague	Met with Queen Beatrix and senior Dutch officials.	December 11, 1982
5	Italy	Rome	Met with President Pertini and senior Italian officials.	December 11–14, 1982
5	France	Paris	Met with President Mitterrand and senior French officials.	December 14–15, 1982
5	Spain	Madrid	Met with Prime Minister González and with Western delegates to the CSCE Meeting.	December 15–16, 1982
5	United Kingdom	London	Met with Prime Minister Thatcher and Foreign Secretary Pym.	December 16–19, 1982
6	Japan	Tokyo	Met with Prime Minister Nakasone and Foreign Minister Abe.	January 30 – February 2, 1983
6	China	Beijing	Met with Chinese leader Deng Xiaoping, Premier Zhao, and senior Chinese officials.	February 2–6, 1983
6	South Korea	Seoul	Met with President Chun and Prime Minister Kim. Visited American and Korean military personnel.	February 6–8, 1983
6	Hong Kong	Hong Kong	Attended a meeting of Chiefs of U.S. Diplomatic Missions in Asia and the Pacific.	February 8–9, 1983
6	Japan	Tokyo	Stopped while returning to U.S.	February 10, 1983
7	Mexico	Mexico City	Attended the 3rd meeting of U.S.-Mexico Binational Commission.	April 18–19, 1983
8	Egypt	Cairo	Attempted to negotiate the withdrawal of foreign forces from Lebanon.	April 25–27, 1983
8	Israel	Jerusalem	Attempted to negotiate the withdrawal of foreign forces from Lebanon.	April 27–28, 1983
8	Lebanon	Beirut	Attempted to negotiate the withdrawal of foreign forces from Lebanon.	April 28, 1983
8	Israel	Jerusalem	Attempted to negotiate the withdrawal of foreign forces from Lebanon.	April 28–30, 1983
8	Lebanon	Beirut	Attempted to negotiate the withdrawal of foreign forces from Lebanon.	April 30 – May 1, 1983
8	Israel	Jerusalem	Attempted to negotiate the withdrawal of foreign forces from Lebanon.	May 1–3, 1983
8	Lebanon	Beirut	Attempted to negotiate the withdrawal of foreign forces from Lebanon.	May 3–4, 1983
8	Israel	Jerusalem	Attempted to negotiate the withdrawal of foreign forces from Lebanon.	May 4–6, 1983
8	Syria	Damascus	Discussed the proposed Israel–Lebanon agreement with President Assad.	May 6, 1983
8	Jordan	Amman	Discussed the proposed Israel–Lebanon agreement with King Hussein.	May 6–7, 1983
8	Saudi Arabia	Jeddah	Discussed the proposed Israel–Lebanon agreement with King Fahd.	May 8, 1983
8	Israel	Jerusalem, Tel Aviv	Discussed the proposed Israel–Lebanon agreement.	May 8, 1983
8	Lebanon	Beirut	Discussed the proposed Israel–Lebanon agreement.	May 8, 1983
8	France	Paris	Attended OECD meeting.	May 8–11, 1983
9	France	Paris	Attended NATO Ministerial Meeting.	June 9–10, 1983
10	Philippines	Manila	Met with President Marcos and senior Philippine officials.	June 26, 1983
10	Thailand	Bangkok	Addressed the opening session of the ASEAN Post-Ministerial Meeting.	June 26–29, 1983
10	India	Agra, New Delhi	Attended a meeting of the U.S.-Indian Joint Commission.	June 30 – July 2, 1983
10	Pakistan	Islamabad, Peshawar	Met with President Zia and Foreign Minister Yaqub Khan. Visited an Afghan Refugee Camp.	July 2–4, 1983
10	Saudi Arabia	Jeddah	Discussed means of withdrawing foreign forces from Lebanon.	July 4–5, 1983
10	Lebanon	Beirut	Discussed means of withdrawing foreign forces from Lebanon.	July 5, 1983
10	Syria	Damascus	Discussed means of withdrawing foreign forces from Lebanon.	July 5–6, 1983
10	Israel	Tel Aviv	Discussed means of withdrawing foreign forces from Lebanon.	July 6–7, 1983
10	Jordan	Amman	Discussed means of withdrawing foreign forces from Lebanon.	July 7, 1983
10	Egypt	Cairo	Discussed means of withdrawing foreign forces from Lebanon.	July 7, 1983
11	Mexico	La Paz	Accompanied President Reagan to a meeting with President de la Madrid.	August 14, 1983
12	Spain	Madrid	Attended the final session of the CSCE Follow-up Meeting. Met with Soviet Foreign Minister Gromyko.	September 7–9, 1983
13	Canada	Halifax	Signed the Great Lakes Phosphorus Load Reduction Agreement.	October 17–20, 1983
14	France	Paris	Discussed the Lebanon situation with the Foreign Ministers of France, Italy, and the United Kingdom.	October 26–27, 1983
15	Japan	Tokyo	Accompanied President Reagan on a State visit.	November 9–12, 1983
15	South Korea	Seoul	Accompanied President Reagan on a State visit.	November 12–14, 1983
16	West Germany	Bonn	Met with Chancellor Kohl and Foreign Minister Genscher.	December 6–7, 1983
16	Belgium	Brussels	Attended NATO Ministerial Meeting.	December 7–9, 1983
16	Tunisia	Tunis	Met with President Bourguiba and senior Tunisian officials.	December 9–10, 1983
16	Morocco	Rabat	Met with King Hassan II.	December 10–12, 1983
16	Portugal	Lisbon	Signed a new agreement relating to economic and military assistance.	December 12–13, 1983
17	United Kingdom	London	Met with Prime Minister Thatcher and Foreign Secretary Howe.	January 15–16, 1984
17	Sweden	Stockholm	Attended the opening session of the Conference on Confidence- and security-building measures and Disarmament in Europe.	January 16–19, 1984
17	Norway	Oslo	Met with King Olav V and Foreign Minister Stray.	January 19, 1984
18	El Salvador	San Salvador	Met with President Magaña and senior Salvadoran officials.	January 31, 1984
18	Venezuela	Caracas	Attended the inauguration of President Lusinchi and met with Central American Foreign Ministers.	February 1–3, 1984
18	Brazil	Brasília	Signed a bilateral science and technology agreement.	February 3–7, 1984
18	Grenada	St. George's	Met with the Governor General and members of the interim government; attended 10th anniversary of independence celebrations.	February 7, 1984
18	Barbados	Bridgetown	Met with representatives of the Organization of Eastern Caribbean States.	February 7–8, 1984
19	Bahamas	Nassau	Vacation	February 16–20, 1984
20	China	Beijing, Xi'an, Shanghai	Accompanied President Reagan on a State visit.	April 26 – May 1, 1984
20	South Korea	Seoul	Met with President Chun and senior Korean officials.	May 1–2, 1984
20	Japan	Tokyo	Stopped while returning to U.S.	May 2, 1984
21	El Salvador	San Salvador	Attended the inauguration of President Duarte.	June 1, 1984
21	Nicaragua	Managua	Met with Comandante Ortega.	June 1, 1984
22	Ireland	Dublin	Accompanied President Reagan.	June 2–4, 1984
22	United Kingdom	London	Accompanied President Reagan to the Economic Summit Meeting.	June 4–9, 1984
23	Hong Kong	Hong Kong	Met with British colonial officials.	July 7–8, 1984
23	Malaysia	Kuala Lumpur	Met with Prime Minister Mohamad and senior Malaysian officials.	July 9–10, 1984
23	Singapore	Singapore	Met with Prime Minister Lee and senior officials.	July 10–11, 1984
23	Indonesia	Jakarta	Attended ASEAN discussions.	July 11–14, 1984
23	Australia	Canberra	Met with Prime Minister Hawke and Foreign Minister Hayden	July 14–15, 1984
23	New Zealand	Wellington	Attended ANZUS Council Meeting.	July 15–17, 1984
24	El Salvador	San Salvador	Met with President Duarte and senior Salvadoran officials.	October 10, 1984
24	Panama	Panama City	Attended the inauguration of President Barletta.	October 10–11, 1984
24	Mexico	Mexico City	Met with President De la Madrid and senior Mexican officials.	October 11–12, 1984
25	Canada	Toronto	Met with Minister for External Affairs Clark.	October 15–16, 1984
26	Brazil	Brasília	Attended OAS General Assembly Meeting.	November 10–13, 1984
27	United Kingdom	Chevening	Met with Foreign Secretary Howe.	December 11–12, 1984
27	Belgium	Brussels	Attended NATO Ministerial Meeting.	December 12–15, 1984
27	West Germany	Ludwigshafen	Met with Chancellor Kohl.	December 15, 1984
28	Switzerland	Geneva	Discussed future strategic arms negotiations with Soviet Foreign Minister Gromyko.	January 6–8, 1985
29	Bahamas	Nassau	Vacation	February 15–18, 1985
30	Ecuador	Guayaquil	Met with President Febres Cordero.	February 28, 1985
30	Uruguay	Montevideo	Attended the inauguration of President Sanguinetti. Returned to Washington March 3.	March 1–2, 1985
31	Soviet Union	Moscow	Accompanied Vice President Bush to the funeral of Soviet General Secretary Chernenko.	March 12–13, 1985
31	Iceland	Reykjavík	Met with Foreign Minister Hallgrímsson while returning from Moscow.	March 14, 1985
32	Canada	Quebec City	Accompanied President Reagan.	March 17–18, 1985
33	West Germany	Bonn	Accompanied President Reagan to the Economic Summit Meeting and on a State visit.	April 30 – May 6, 1985
33	Spain	Madrid	Accompanied President Reagan on a State visit.	May 6–8, 1985
33	France	Strasbourg	Accompanied President Reagan to the European Parliament.	May 8, 1985
33	Portugal	Lisbon	Accompanied President Reagan to the European Parliament.	May 8–10, 1985
33	Israel	Tel Aviv, Jerusalem	Discussed the Middle East peace process with Foreign Minister Shamir.	May 10–12, 1985
33	Egypt	Cairo	Discussed the Middle East peace process with President Mubarak.	May 12, 1985
33	Jordan	Aqaba	Discussed the Middle East peace process with King Hussein.	May 12–13, 1985
33	Austria	Vienna	Attended ceremonies commemorating the 30th anniversary of the Austrian State Treaty. Met with Soviet Foreign Minister Gromyko.	May 13–15, 1985
34	Portugal	Lisbon	Attended NATO Ministerial Meeting.	June 6–7, 1985
34	United Kingdom	London	Met with Prime Minister Thatcher. Attended a conference of U.S. Chiefs of Mission. Returned by way of Bermuda.	June 7–8, 1985
35	Hong Kong	Hong Kong	Stopped en route to Thailand.	July 6–7, 1985
35	Thailand	Bangkok	Met with Prime Minister Prem and senior Thai officials. Also visited Cambodian refugee camps on the Thai border.	July 8–10, 1985
35	Malaysia	Kuala Lumpur	Attended ASEAN Post-Ministerial consultation.	July 10–12, 1985
35	Australia	Perth, Canberra	Attended ANZUS Ministerial Meeting.	July 13–16, 1985
35	Fiji	Nadi	Met with Prime Minister Mara.	July 16, 1985
36	Mexico	Mexico City	Attended a meeting of U.S.-Mexico Binational Commission.	July 25–26, 1985
37	Finland	Helsinki	Attended ceremonies commemorating 10th anniversary of the Final Act of the Conference on Security and Cooperation in Europe. Met with Soviet Foreign Minister Shevardnadze.	July 29 – August 1, 1985
38	Belgium	Brussels	Addressed a special meeting of NATO Foreign Ministers.	October 15, 1985
39	Canada	Calgary	Met with Minister for External Affairs Clark.	October 27–28, 1985
40	Ireland	Shannon	Held a press conference while en route to Finland.	November 2, 1985
40	Finland	Helsinki	Met with President Koivisto and Foreign Minister Väyrynen while en route to Moscow.	November 3, 1985
40	Soviet Union	Moscow	Discussed preparations for the Geneva Summit Meeting.	November 4–5, 1985
40	Iceland	Reykjavík	Met with President Finnbogadóttir and Foreign Minister Mathiesen	November 6, 1985
41	Switzerland	Geneva	Accompanied President Reagan to the Summit Meeting with Soviet General Secretary Mikhail Gorbachev.	November 16–21, 1985
41	Belgium	Brussels	Attended a special session of the North Atlantic Council.	November 21, 1985
42	Colombia	Cartagena	Attended the opening session of OAS General Assembly.	December 1, 1985
43	United Kingdom	London	Met with Prime Minister Thatcher and Foreign Secretary Howe.	December 10–11, 1985
43	Belgium	Brussels	Attended NATO Ministerial Meeting and a U.S.-European Community Ministerial Meeting.	December 11–13, 1985
43	West Germany	Bonn	Met with Chancellor Kohl and Foreign Minister Genscher.	December 13–14, 1985
43	Germany	West Berlin	Addressed the Berlin Press Conference and signed the Golden Book.	December 14–15, 1985
43	Romania	Bucharest	Met with President Ceaușescu and senior Romanian officials.	December 15, 1985
43	Hungary	Budapest	Met with First Secretary Kádár and senior Hungarian officials.	December 15–17, 1985
43	Yugoslavia	Belgrade	Met with Prime Minister Planinc and Foreign Affairs Secretary Dizdarević	December 17–18, 1985
44	Mexico	Mexicali	Accompanied President Reagan to a meeting with President de la Madrid.	January 3, 1986
45	Bahamas	Nassau	Vacation	February 12–17, 1986
46	Grenada	St. George's	Accompanied President Reagan.	February 20, 1986
47	Sweden	Stockholm	Attended the funeral of Prime Minister Palme and met with Soviet Premier Ryzhkov.	March 14–16, 1986
48	France	Paris	Met with President Mitterrand and Prime Minister Chirac.	March 21, 1986
48	Turkey	Istanbul, Ankara	Discussed economic and defense matters with Prime Minister Özal and senior Turkish officials.	March 22–25, 1986
48	Greece	Athens	Discussed defense issues with Prime Minister Papandreou and senior Greek officials.	March 25–28, 1986
48	Italy	Rome	Met with Prime Minister Craxi and senior Italian officials.	March 28–30, 1986
48	Vatican City State	Vatican City	Audience with Pope John Paul II.	March 29, 1986
49	Indonesia	Bali	Accompanied President Reagan to ASEAN Ministerial Meeting.	April 29 – May 2, 1986
49	Japan	Tokyo	Accompanied President Reagan to the Economic Summit Meeting.	May 2–7, 1986
49	South Korea	Seoul	Met with President Chun and senior Korean officials.	May 7–8, 1986
49	Philippines	Manila	Met with President Aquino and Vice President Laurel.	May 8–9, 1986
50	Canada	Halifax	Attended NATO Ministerial meeting.	May 29–30, 1986
51	Hong Kong	Hong Kong	Stopped en route to China.	June 21–23, 1986
51	Singapore	Singapore	Met with Prime Minister Lee and senior officials.	June 23–24, 1986
51	Brunei	Bandar Seri Begawan	Met with Sultan Hassanal Bolkiah.	June 24, 1986
51	Philippines	Manila	Attended ASEAN Post-Ministerial Meeting. Also met with New Zealand Prime Minister Lange.	June 24–28, 1986
51	Palau	Koror	Met with Prime Minister Selii.	June 28, 1986
52	Colombia	Bogotá	Attended the inauguration of President Barco.	August 6–7, 1986
53	Haiti	Port-au-Prince	Met with President Namphy.	August 15, 1986
53	Dominican Republic	Santo Domingo	Attended the inauguration of President Balaguer.	August 15, 1986
54	Iceland	Reykjavík	Accompanied President Reagan to a meeting with Soviet General Secretary Gorbachev.	October 9–12, 1986
54	Belgium	Brussels	Briefed NATO Foreign Ministers on the U.S.-Soviet pre-summit meeting.	October 13, 1986
55	El Salvador	San Salvador	Met with President Duarte. Assessed earthquake damage.	October 16, 1986
56	Austria	Vienna	Attended the opening of the Follow-up Meeting of the Conference on Security and Co-operation in Europe.	November 4–6, 1986
56	France	Paris	Met with Prime Minister Chirac.	November 6, 1986
57	Guatemala	Guatemala City	Attended OAS General Assembly Meeting.	November 10–11, 1986
58	Canada	Ottawa	Met with Minister for External Affairs Clark.	November 21, 1986
59	United Kingdom	Chevening	Met with Foreign Secretary Howe.	December 9–10, 1986
59	Belgium	Brussels	Attended NATO Ministerial Meeting.	December 10–12, 1986
60	Bermuda	Bermuda	Met with Foreign Secretary Howe.	January 6–7, 1987
60	Senegal	Dakar	Met with President Diouf.	January 8–9, 1987
60	Cameroon	Douala	Met with President Biya.	January 9, 1987
60	Kenya	Nairobi	Met with President Moi.	January 9–12, 1987
60	Nigeria	Lagos	Met with President Babangida.	January 12, 1987
60	Ivory Coast	Abidjan	Met with President Houphouët-Boigny.	January 12–14, 1987
60	Liberia	Monrovia	Met with President Doe.	January 14, 1987
61	Hong Kong	Hong Kong	Stopped en route to China.	February 27 – March 1, 1987
61	China	Beijing, Guilin, Dalian, Shanghai, Qufu	Met with Chinese leader Deng Xiaoping, Premier Zhao, President Li Xiannian, and Chinese officials.	March 1–6, 1987
61	South Korea	Seoul	Met with President Chun and senior Korean officials.	March 6, 1987
61	Japan	Tokyo	Met with Prime Minister Nakasone and senior Japanese officials.	March 6–7, 1987
62	Canada	Ottawa	Accompanied President Reagan on an official visit.	April 5–6, 1987
63	Ireland	Shannon	Held a press briefing en route to Finland.	April 11, 1987
63	Finland	Helsinki	Met with President Koivisto en route to Moscow.	April 12–13, 1987
63	Soviet Union	Moscow	Discussed limitations of intermediate-range nuclear arms.	April 13–15, 1987
63	Belgium	Brussels	Briefed NATO Foreign Ministers on his visit to Moscow.	April 15–16, 1987
64	Italy	Venice	Accompanied President Reagan to the Economic Summit Meeting.	June 3–11, 1987
64	Iceland	Reykjavík	Attended NATO Ministerial Meeting.	June 11–12, 1987
65	Philippines	Manila, Cavite City	Met with President Aquino. Signed an emergency aid package. Visited Corregidor.	June 13–17, 1987
65	Singapore	Singapore	Attended ASEAN Post-Ministerial Meeting.	June 17–20, 1987
65	Australia	Sydney	Met with Prime Minister Hawke and Foreign Minister Hayden.	June 20–22, 1987
65	Western Samoa	Apia	Met with Prime Minister Kolone.	June 22, 1987
66	Canada	Windsor	Met with Minister for External Affairs Clark.	July 2, 1987
67	Israel	Jerusalem, Tel Aviv	Met with Prime Minister Shamir and Foreign Minister Peres.	October 16–17, 1987
67	Saudi Arabia	Jeddah	Met with King Fahd.	October 17, 1987
67	Israel	Jerusalem, Tel Aviv, Rehovot	Further meetings with Israeli officials. Received an honorary degree from the Weizmann Institute.	October 17–19, 1987
67	Egypt	Cairo	Met with President Mubarak.	October 19, 1987
67	United Kingdom	London	Met with King Hussein of Jordan.	October 19–20, 1987
67	Finland	Helsinki	Met with President Koivisto en route to Moscow.	October 20–21, 1987
67	Soviet Union	Moscow	Discussed INF limitations with Soviet officials.	October 22–23, 1987
67	Belgium	Brussels	Briefed NATO Foreign Ministers on his visit to Moscow.	October 23–24, 1987
68	Switzerland	Geneva	Attended INF negotiations with Soviet Foreign Minister Shevardnadze.	November 22–25, 1987
68	Belgium	Brussels	Briefed NATO Foreign Ministers on the INF negotiations.	November 25, 1987
69	Belgium	Brussels	Attended a NATO Ministerial Meeting and met with EEC representatives. Signed the INF Basing Inspection Agreement.	December 11–12, 1987
69	Denmark	Copenhagen	Met with Prime Minister Schlüter and Foreign Minister Ellemann-Jensen.	December 12–13, 1987
69	Norway	Oslo	Met with King Olav V and senior Norwegian officials.	December 13–15, 1987
69	West Germany	Bonn	Met with Chancellor Kohl and senior West German officials.	December 15, 1987
69	United Kingdom	London	Met with Prime Minister Thatcher and Foreign Secretary Howe.	December 15–16, 1987
70	Canada	Ottawa	Signed the Arctic Cooperation Agreement.	January 11, 1988
71	Mexico	Mazatlan	Accompanied President Reagan to a meeting with President de la Madrid.	February 13, 1988
72	Finland	Helsinki	Met with President Koivisto en route to Moscow.	February 20–21, 1988
72	Soviet Union	Moscow	Met with Foreign Minister Shevardnadze and General Secretary Gorbachev.	February 21–23, 1988
72	Belgium	Brussels	Briefed NATO Foreign Ministers on his visit to Moscow.	February 23, 1988
73	Israel	Tel Aviv, Jerusalem	Met with Prime Minister Shamir and senior Israeli officials. Discussed a Middle East Peace Initiative.	February 25–27, 1988
73	Syria	Damascus	Met with President Assad and Foreign Minister Khaddam regarding a Middle East Peace Initiative.	February 27, 1988
73	Jordan	Amman	Met with Crown Prince Hassan and Prime Minister Rifai regarding a Middle East Peace Initiative.	February 27, 1988
73	Israel	Tel Aviv, Jerusalem	Briefed Israeli officials on his visits to Jordan and Syria.	February 28, 1988
73	Egypt	Cairo	Discussed a Middle East Peace Initiative with President Mubarak.	February 28, 1988
73	Israel	Tel Aviv, Jerusalem	Discussed a Middle East Peace Initiative.	February 28, 1988
73	Jordan	Amman	Briefed Crown Prince Hassan and senior officials on meetings with other Arab leaders.	February 29, 1988
73	Israel	Tel Aviv, Jerusalem	Discussed a Middle East Peace Initiative.	February 29 – March 1, 1988
73	United Kingdom	London	Met with King Hussein of Jordan regarding a Middle East Peace Initiative.	March 1, 1988
73	Belgium	Brussels	Attended NATO Summit Meeting with President Reagan.	March 1–3, 1988
73	United Kingdom	London	Met with King Hussein of Jordan regarding a Middle East Peace Initiative.	March 3, 1988
73	Israel	Jerusalem	Discussed a Middle East Peace Initiative.	March 3–4, 1988
73	Syria	Damascus	Discussed a Middle East Peace Initiative.	March 4, 1988
73	Egypt	Cairo	Discussed a Middle East Peace Initiative.	March 4, 1988
74	Italy	Rome	Signed a Scientific and Technological Cooperation Agreement.	April 1–3, 1988
74	Vatican City State	Vatican City	Audience with Pope John Paul II.	April 2, 1988
74	Israel	Tel Aviv, Jerusalem	Discussed a Middle East peace initiative.	April 3–4, 1988
74	Jordan	Amman	Discussed a Middle East peace initiative.	April 5, 1988
74	Syria	Damascus	Discussed a Middle East peace initiative.	April 5, 1988
74	Egypt	Cairo	Discussed a Middle East peace initiative.	April 6, 1988
74	Jordan	Amman	Discussed a Middle East peace initiative.	April 6, 1988
74	Saudi Arabia	Qasim	Met with King Fahd.	April 7, 1988
74	Jordan	Amman	Discussed a Middle East Peace Initiative.	April 7–8, 1988
74	Cyprus	Larnaca	Met with Lebanese President Gemayel.	April 8, 1988
75	Switzerland	Geneva	Attended the signing of an agreement for the withdrawal of Soviet forces from Afghanistan.	April 14, 1988
76	Finland	Helsinki	Met with President Koivisto en route to Moscow.	April 20, 1988
76	Soviet Union	Moscow, Kiev, Tbilisi	Discussed preparations for the U.S.-Soviet Summit Meeting.	April 21–24, 1988
76	Belgium	Brussels	Briefed NATO Foreign Ministers on his visit to Moscow.	April 25, 1988
77	Switzerland	Geneva	Met with Soviet Foreign Minister Shevardnadze; discussed INF verification procedures.	May 11–12, 1988
77	Belgium	Brussels	Met with NATO Foreign Ministers.	May 13, 1988
78	Finland	Helsinki	Accompanied President Reagan to meetings with President Koivisto en route to Moscow.	May 27–29, 1988
78	Soviet Union	Moscow	Accompanied President Reagan to a Summit Meeting.	May 29 – June 2, 1988
79	Egypt	Cairo	Discussed a Middle East peace initiative.	June 3–4, 1988
79	Jordan	Amman	Discussed a Middle East peace initiative.	June 4, 1988
79	Israel	Tel Aviv, Jerusalem	Discussed a Middle East peace initiative.	June 5, 1988
79	Egypt	Cairo	Discussed a Middle East peace initiative.	June 5, 1988
79	Syria	Damascus	Discussed a Middle East peace initiative.	June 6, 1988
79	Egypt	Luxor, Cairo	Discussed a Middle East peace initiative.	June 6–7, 1988
79	Spain	Madrid	Attended NATO Ministerial Meeting.	June 7–10, 1988
79	Canada	Toronto	Accompanied President Reagan to the Economic Summit Meeting.	June 19–21, 1988
80	Guatemala	Guatemala City	Met with President Vinicio Cerezo. Signed an economic assistance agreement. Met with Nicaraguan Resistance leaders.	June 29, 1988
80	El Salvador	San Salvador	Met with Acting President Castillo Claramount and Salvadoran officials and military officers. Signed an economic assistance agreement.	June 30, 1988
80	Honduras	Tegucigalpa, Palmerola	Met with President Azcona. Signed a health sector project agreement.	June 30, 1988
80	Costa Rica	San José	Met with President Arias.	July 1, 1988
81	Thailand	Bangkok	Attended the ASEAN Post-Ministerial Conference.	July 6–9, 1988
81	Malaysia	Kuala Lumpur	Met with Prime Minister Mahathir.	July 9, 1988
81	Indonesia	Jakarta	Met with President Suharto and senior Indonesian officials. Signed agreements on double taxation.	July 9–11, 1988
81	Philippines	Manila	Met with President Aquino and senior Philippine officials.	July 11–13, 1988
81	Hong Kong	Hong Kong	Met with British colonial officials.	July 13–14, 1988
81	China	Beijing	Met with Chinese leader Deng Xiaoping and senior Chinese officials.	July 14–16, 1988
81	South Korea	Seoul	Met with President Roh and senior Korean officials.	July 16–18, 1988
81	Japan	Tokyo	Met with Prime Minister Takeshita and Foreign Minister Uno.	July 18–20, 1988
81	Marshall Islands	Majuro	Attended a commemorative ceremony.	July 20, 1988
82	Guatemala	Guatemala City	Met with the Foreign Ministers of Guatemala, Costa Rica, Honduras, and El Salvador.	August 1, 1988
82	Argentina	Buenos Aires	Met with President Alfonsín and senior Argentine officials.	August 2–4, 1988
82	Uruguay	Montevideo	Met with President Sanguinetti and senior Uruguayan officials.	August 4, 1988
82	Brazil	Rio de Janeiro, Brasília	Met with President Sarney and senior Brazilian officials.	August 4–8, 1988
82	Bolivia	La Paz	Met with President Paz and senior Bolivian officials.	August 8–9, 1988
82	Costa Rica	San José	Met with President Arias.	August 9, 1988
82	Honduras	Tegucigalpa	Met with President Azcona.	August 9, 1988
82	El Salvador	San Salvador	Met with Acting President Castillo Claramount.	August 9, 1988
82	Ecuador	Quito	Met with President-elect Borja.	August 10, 1988
83	Egypt	Cairo	Stopped en route to Pakistan.	August 19, 1988
83	Pakistan	Islamabad	Attended the funeral of President Zia.	August 19–20, 1988
83	Egypt	Cairo	Met with Foreign Minister Ghali while returning to U.S.	August 21, 1988
84	El Salvador	San Salvador	Attended OAS General Assembly Meeting.	November 14, 1988
85	Mexico	Mexico City	Attended the inauguration of President Salinas de Gortari.	December 1, 1988
86	Belgium	Brussels	Attended NATO and EEC Ministerial Meetings.	December 7–9, 1988
87	France	Paris	Attended the Conference on the Prohibition of Chemical Weapons.	January 6–8, 1989
88	Austria	Vienna	Attended the closing session of the CSCE Follow-up Meeting.	January 16–18, 1989

== James Baker ==
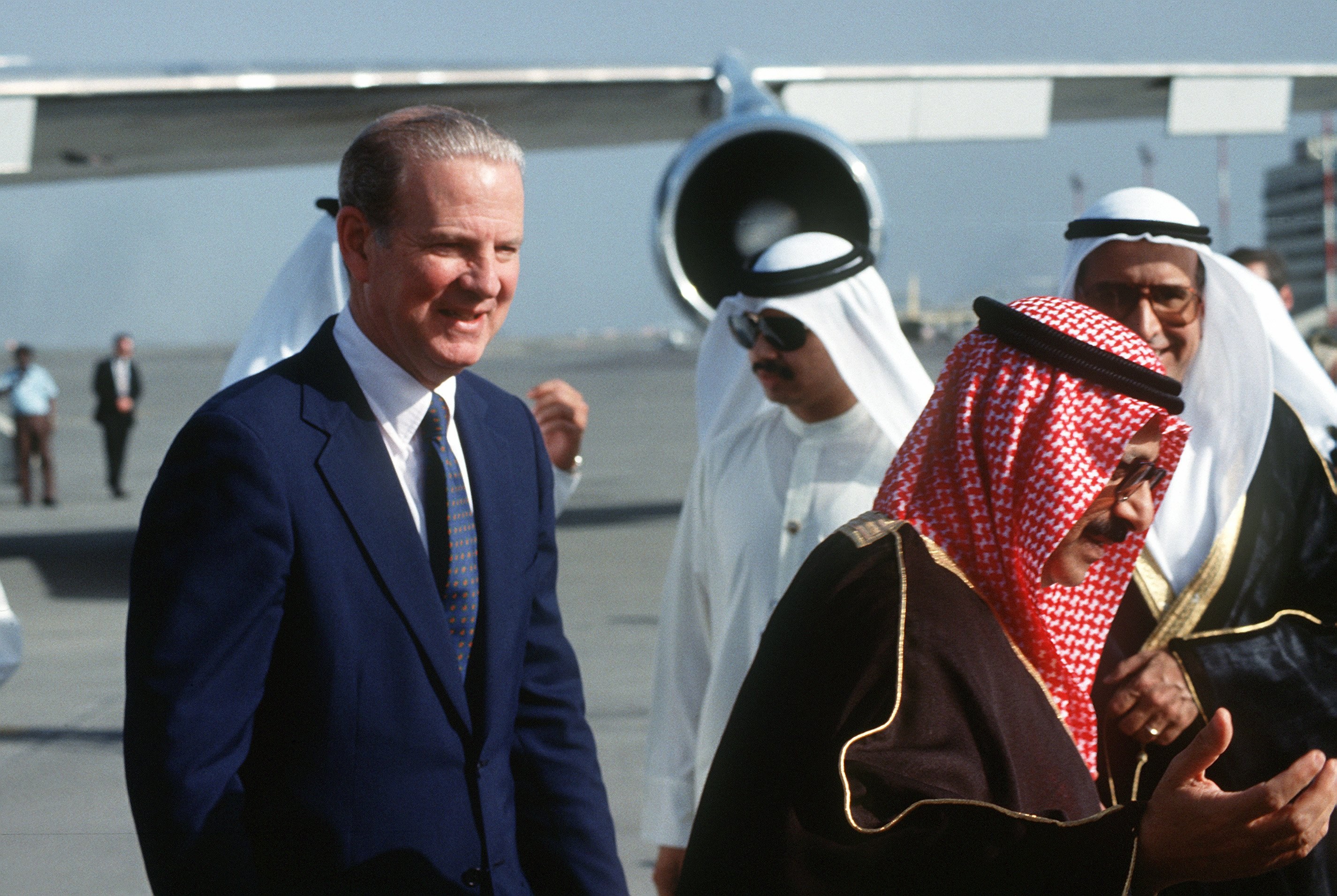
Secretary of State James Baker with Kuwaiti officials in the aftermath of Operation Desert Storm in Kuwait International Airport, 1991

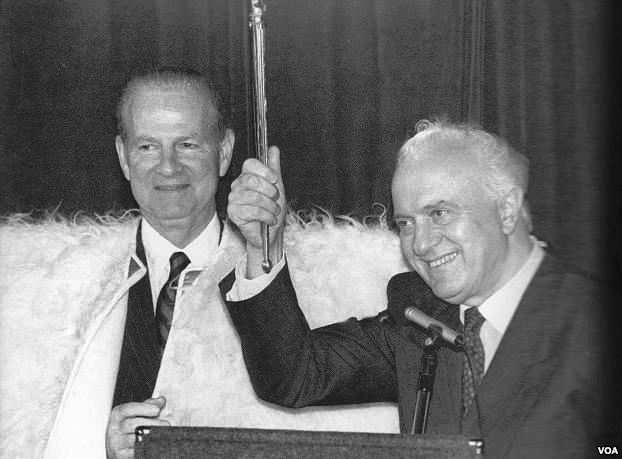
James Baker with Eduard Shevardnadze in Tbilisi, 1992.

- James Baker (in office 1989–1992)

	Country	Locations	Details	Dates
1	Canada	Ottawa	Accompanied President Bush on a working visit.	February 10, 1989
1	Iceland	Reykjavík	Met with Foreign Minister Hannibalsson.	February 11, 1989
1	United Kingdom	London	Met with Foreign Secretary Howe.	February 11–12, 1989
1	West Germany	Bonn	Discussed modernization of short-range NATO nuclear missiles with Foreign Minister Genscher.	February 12–14, 1989
1	Denmark	Copenhagen	Met with Foreign Minister Ellemann-Jensen.	February 13, 1989
1	Norway	Oslo	Met with Prime Minister Brundtland and Foreign Minister Stoltenberg.	February 13, 1989
1	Turkey	Ankara	Met with Prime Minister Özal and Foreign Minister Yilmaz.	February 14, 1989
1	Greece	Athens	Met with Prime Minister Papandreou and Foreign Minister Papoulias	February 14, 1989
1	Italy	Rome	Met with Foreign Minister Andreotti.	February 14–15, 1989
1	Spain	Madrid	Met with Foreign Minister Fernández–Ordóñez.	February 15, 1989
1	Portugal	Lisbon	Met with Prime Minister Cavaco Silva and Foreign Minister Pinheiro.	February 15, 1989
1	Belgium	Brussels	Met with Foreign Minister Tindemans and NATO officials.	February 15–17, 1989
1	Luxembourg	Luxembourg	Met with Prime Minister Santer and Foreign Minister Poos.	February 16, 1989
1	Netherlands	The Hague	Met with Foreign Minister van den Broek.	February 16, 1989
1	France	Paris	Met with Prime Minister Rocard and Foreign Minister Dumas.	February 17, 1989
2	Japan	Tokyo	Accompanied President Bush.	February 23–25, 1989
2	South Korea	Seoul	Accompanied President Bush on an official visit.	February 27, 1989
3	Austria	Vienna	Attended CSCE Meetings on confidence- and security-building measures and conventional armed forces in Europe. Met with Soviet Foreign Minister Shevardnadze.	March 4–7, 1989
4	Finland	Helsinki	Overnight stop en route to Moscow.	May 9–10, 1989
4	Soviet Union	Moscow	Met with General Secretary Gorbachev, senior Soviet officials, and human rights activists.	May 10–11, 1989
4	Belgium	Brussels	Briefed NATO Foreign Ministers on his visit to Moscow.	May 11–12, 1989
5	Italy	Rome	Accompanied President Bush. Also met with South African Foreign Minister Botha.	May 26–28, 1989
5	Vatican City State	Vatican City	Audience with Pope John Paul II.	May 27, 1989
5	Belgium	Brussels	Accompanied President Bush to NATO Summit Meeting.	May 28–30, 1989
5	West Germany	Bonn	Accompanied President Bush.	May 30–31, 1989
5	United Kingdom	London	Accompanied President Bush.	May 31 – June 2, 1989
6	Japan	Tokyo	Attended the Multilateral Assistance Initiative for the Philippines conference.	July 4–5, 1989
6	Brunei	Bandar Seri Begawan	Attended ASEAN Post-Ministerial Meeting.	July 5–8, 1989
6	Oman	Masqat	Stopped while traveling to Poland to join President Bush.	July 8, 1989
6	Poland	Warsaw, Gdańsk	Accompanied President Bush.	July 9–11, 1989
6	Hungary	Budapest	Accompanied President Bush.	July 11–13, 1989
6	France	Paris	Accompanied President Bush to the Economic Summit Meeting.	July 13–17, 1989
6	Netherlands	The Hague	Accompanied President Bush.	July 17–18, 1989
6	France	Paris	Attended the opening of the International Conference on Cambodia. Also met with Soviet Foreign Minister Shevardnadze.	July 28–31, 1989
7	Mexico	Mexico City	Attended the 7th meeting of the U.S.-Mexico Binational Commission.	August 6–7, 1989
8	Costa Rica	San José	Accompanied President Bush to Hemispheric Summit Meeting.	October 27–28, 1989
9	Australia	Sydney, Canberra	Attended U.S.-Australian Bilateral Ministerial Meeting and Conference on Asia Pacific Economic Cooperation.	November 1–8, 1989
10	Malta	Valletta, Marsaxlokk	Accompanied President Bush to meetings with Soviet General Secretary Gorbachev.	December 1–3, 1989
10	Belgium	Brussels	Accompanied President Bush to meetings with NATO heads of state and government.	December 3–4, 1989
11	United Kingdom	London	Met with Prime Minister Thatcher and Foreign Secretary Hurd.	December 11, 1989
11	Germany	West Berlin	Met with West German Chancellor Kohl; delivered a public address.	December 11–12, 1989
11	East Germany	Potsdam	Met with East German Prime Minister Modrow and with religious leaders.	December 12, 1989
11	Belgium	Brussels	Discussed aid to Eastern Europe with representatives of the Group of 24; attended a NATO Foreign Ministers Meeting.	December 13–15, 1989
11	Netherlands Antilles	Sint Maarten	Accompanied President Bush en route to meeting with French President Mitterrand.	December 16, 1989
11	France	Saint-Martin	Accompanied President Bush to an informal meeting with President Mitterrand.	December 16, 1989
12	Ireland	Shannon	Met with French Foreign Minister Dumas.	February 6, 1990
12	Czechoslovakia	Prague	Met with President Havel; delivered an address at Charles University.	February 6, 1990
12	Soviet Union	Moscow	Met with Soviet leaders; addressed the International Affairs Committee of the Supreme Soviet.	February 7–10, 1990
12	Bulgaria	Sofia	Met with Bulgarian officials and opposition leaders.	February 10–11, 1990
12	Romania	Bucharest	Met with Romanian officials and opposition leaders.	February 11, 1990
12	Canada	Ottawa	Attended Open skies Ministerial Conference of NATO and Warsaw Pact Foreign Ministers.	February 11–13, 1990
12	Colombia	Cartagena	Accompanied President Bush to Drug Summit Meeting with the presidents of Colombia, Bolivia, and Peru.	February 15, 1990
13	Namibia	Windhoek	Attended Namibian independence ceremonies. Met with Soviet Foreign Minister Shevardnadze.	March 19–22, 1990
13	South Africa	Cape Town, Johannesburg, Soweto	Met with President F. W. de Klerk, South African officials, and leaders of the African National Congress (ANC).	March 22–23, 1990
13	Zaire	Kinshasa	Met with President Mobutu and with UNITA leader Jonas Savimbi.	March 23–24, 1990
14	Bermuda	Bermuda	Accompanied President Bush to an informal meeting with Prime Minister Thatcher.	April 13–14, 1990
15	Belgium	Brussels	Met with NATO and European Community Foreign Ministers.	May 3, 1990
15	West Germany	Bonn	Attended Two-Plus-Four Ministerial Meeting on German reunification.	May 4–6, 1990
15	Poland	Warsaw	Met with Polish officials and leaders of Solidarity.	May 6, 1990
16	Soviet Union	Moscow, Zagorsk, Radonezh	Attended pre-summit and arms reduction negotiations with senior Soviet officials. Also met with Egyptian President Mubarak and Lithuanian Prime Minister Prunskienė.	May 15–19, 1990
17	Denmark	Copenhagen	Attended CSCE Meeting and met with Soviet Foreign Minister Shevardnadze.	June 5–6, 1990
17	United Kingdom	Turnberry	Attended NATO Foreign Ministers meeting.	June 6–8, 1990
18	Guatemala	Guatemala City, Antigua	Met with Presidents of the Central American Republics.	June 17–19, 1990
19	East Germany	East Berlin	Attended Two-Plus-Four Foreign Ministers Meeting.	June 20–22, 1990
19	Ireland	Shannon	Met with Foreign Minister Collins.	June 23, 1990
20	Belgium	Brussels	Attended meeting of the Group of 24.	July 3–4, 1990
20	United Kingdom	London	Accompanied President Bush to NATO Summit Meeting.	July 5–6, 1990
21	France	Paris	Attended Two-Plus-Four Foreign Ministers Meeting.	July 16–18, 1990
22	Indonesia	Jakarta	Attended ASEAN Post-Ministerial Conference.	July 26–29, 1990
22	Singapore	Singapore	Attended Second Asia-Pacific Economic Cooperation Meeting.	July 29–31, 1990
22	Soviet Union	Irkutsk	Met with Foreign Minister Shevardnadze.	July 31 – August 2, 1990
22	Mongolia	Ulaanbaatar	Met with President Ochirbat and Foreign Gombossüren.	August 2–3, 1990
22	Soviet Union	Moscow	Met with Foreign Minister Shevardnadze; issued a joint statement on the Iraqi invasion of Kuwait.	August 3, 1990
23	Turkey	Ankara	Met with President Özal and senior Turkish officials.	August 8–9, 1990
23	Belgium	Brussels	Attended a special session of the North Atlantic Council.	August 10, 1990
24	Saudi Arabia	Jeddah, Taif	Met with King Fahd and with Emir al-Sabah of Kuwait; discussed financing of U.S. military presence. Visited U.S. military personnel.	September 6–7, 1990
24	United Arab Emirates	Abu Dhabi	Met with Sheikh al-Nahyan.	September 7, 1990
24	Egypt	Cairo, Alexandria	Met with President Mubarak. Discussed increased Egyptian military commitment in the Persian Gulf.	September 7–8, 1990
24	Finland	Helsinki	Accompanied President Bush to summit meeting with Soviet President Gorbachev.	September 8–10, 1990
24	Belgium	Brussels	Briefed NATO Foreign Ministers on the U.S.-Soviet summit meeting and the Persian Gulf crisis.	September 10, 1990
24	Soviet Union	Moscow	Met with President Gorbachev and Foreign Minister Shevardnadze. Attended Two-Plus-Four Foreign Ministers Meeting. Signed Treaty on the Final Settlement With Respect to Germany.	September 10–13, 1990
24	Syria	Damascus	Met with President Assad and Foreign Minister Farouk al-Sharaa.	September 13–14, 1990
24	Italy	Rome	Met with senior Italian officials.	September 15, 1990
24	West Germany	Bonn, Ludwigshafen	Met with Chancellor Kohl and Foreign Minister Genscher.	September 15, 1990
25	Bahrain	Manama	Met with Amir Sheikh Isa bin Sulman al-Khalifa.	November 4–5, 1990
25	Saudi Arabia	Jeddah, Taif	Met with King Fahd, Foreign Minister Prince Saud, and the Emir of Kuwait. Addressed U.S. military personnel	November 4–6, 1990
25	Egypt	Cairo	Met with President Mubarak and Chinese Foreign Minister Qian	November 6–7, 1990
25	Turkey	Ankara	Met with President Özal.	November 7, 1990
25	Soviet Union	Moscow	Met with President Gorbachev.	November 7–9, 1990
25	United Kingdom	London	Met with Prime Minister Thatcher.	November 9–10, 1990
25	France	Paris	Met with President Mitterrand.	November 10, 1990
26	Bermuda	Bermuda	Met with Canadian External Affairs Minister Clark.	November 13, 1990
27	Belgium	Brussels	Attended U.S.-European Community Meeting.	November 16–17, 1990
27	Switzerland	Geneva	Discussed the Persian Gulf crisis with the Foreign Ministers of Ethiopia, Côte d'Ivoire, and Zaire.	November 17, 1990
27	France	Paris	Discussed the Persian Gulf crisis with the Foreign Ministers of Romania, Finland, France, the United Kingdom, and the Soviet Union. Joined President Bush for meetings with Soviet leader Gorbachev, CSCE Summit meeting, and signing of the Conventional Forces in Europe Treaty.	November 17–21, 1990
27	Saudi Arabia	Jeddah	Accompanied President Bush to meetings with King Fahd and the Amir of Kuwait.	November 21–22, 1990
27	Yemen	Sana'a	Discussed the Persian Gulf crisis with President Ali Abdullah Salih.	November 22, 1990
27	Egypt	Cairo	Accompanied President Bush to meeting with President Mubarak.	November 23, 1990
27	Colombia	Bogotá	Discussed the Persian Gulf crisis with President Gaviria and Foreign Minister Jaramillo.	November 24, 1990
28	Belgium	Brussels	Attended NATO Ministerial Meeting.	December 16–18, 1990
29	United Kingdom	London	Discussed the Persian Gulf crisis with Foreign Secretary Hurd, EEC Chairman Poos, Spanish Foreign Minister Fernández Ordóñez, and NATO Secretary General Wörner.	January 6–8, 1991
29	France	Paris	Discussed the Persian Gulf crisis with President Mitterrand and Foreign Minister Dumas.	January 8, 1991
29	Germany	Bonn	Discussed the Persian Gulf crisis with Chancellor Kohl.	January 8, 1991
29	Italy	Milan	Discussed the Persian Gulf crisis with Foreign Minister De Michelis.	January 8, 1991
29	Switzerland	Geneva	Discussed the Persian Gulf crisis with Iraqi Foreign Minister Aziz.	January 8–10, 1991
29	Saudi Arabia	Riyadh	Discussed the Persian Gulf crisis with King Fahd and Foreign Minister Prince Saud.	January 10–11, 1991
29	United Arab Emirates	Abu Dhabi	Discussed the Persian Gulf crisis with Sheikh Zayed.	January 11, 1991
29	Saudi Arabia	Taif	Discussed the Persian Gulf crisis with the Amir of Kuwait. Addressed U.S. military personnel in eastern Saudi Arabia.	January 11, 1991
29	Egypt	Cairo	Discussed the Persian Gulf crisis with President Mubarak and Foreign Minister Abdel-Meguid.	January 11–12, 1991
29	Syria	Damascus	Discussed the Persian Gulf crisis with President Assad and Foreign Minister Sharaa.	January 12, 1991
29	Turkey	İncirlik, Ankara	Discussed the Persian Gulf crisis with President Özal and Foreign Minister Alptemoçin.	January 12–13, 1991
29	United Kingdom	Alconbury	Discussed the Persian Gulf crisis with Prime Minister Major.	January 13, 1991
29	Canada	Ottawa	Discussed the Persian Gulf crisis with Prime Minister Mulroney.	January 13–14, 1991
30	Saudi Arabia	Taif, Riyadh	Met with the Amir of Kuwait and with the Foreign Ministers of Egypt, Syria, and the Gulf Cooperation Council.	March 8–10, 1991
30	Egypt	Cairo	Met with President Mubarak.	March 10–11, 1991
30	Israel	Jerusalem, Karmiel	Discussed the Middle East peace process with President Herzog, Prime Minister Shamir, Foreign Minister Levy, and Palestinian representatives.	March 11–13, 1991
30	Syria	Damascus	Discussed the Middle East peace process with President Assad and Foreign Minister Sharaa.	March 13–14, 1991
30	Soviet Union	Moscow	Met with President Gorbachev and Foreign Minister Bessmertnkyh.	March 14–16, 1991
30	Turkey	Ankara	Met with President Özal and senior Turkish officials.	March 16, 1991
31	Turkey	Ankara, Diyarbakır, Çukurca, Üzümlü	Discussed emergency aid to Kurdish refugees with President Özal; visited refugee camps.	April 7–8, 1991
31	Israel	Jerusalem	Discussed the Middle East peace process with Prime Minister Shamir, Israeli officials, and a Palestinian delegation.	April 8–10, 1991
31	Egypt	Cairo	Discussed the Middle East peace process with President Mubarak, Foreign Minister Abdel-Meguid, and Saudi Foreign Minister Prince Saud.	April 10–11, 1991
31	Syria	Damascus	Discussed the Middle East peace process with President Assad, Foreign Minister Sharaa, and Tunisian Foreign Minister Habib Ben Yahya.	April 11–12, 1991
31	Switzerland	Geneva	Discussed the Middle East peace process with Jordanian Foreign Minister Taher Masri. Also discussed aid to Kurdish refugees with heads of international relief agencies.	April 12, 1991
32	Luxembourg	Luxembourg	Discussed aid to Kurdish refugees and the Middle East peace process with European Community Foreign Ministers.	April 17–18, 1991
32	Israel	Jerusalem	Discussed the Middle East peace process with senior Israeli officials and Palestinian representatives.	April 18–20, 1991
32	Jordan	Aqaba	Discussed the Middle East peace process with King Hussein.	April 20, 1991
32	Egypt	Cairo	Discussed the Middle East peace process with President Mubarak and Foreign Minister Abdel-Meguid.	April 20–21, 1991
32	Saudi Arabia	Jeddah	Discussed the Middle East peace process with King Fahd and Foreign Minister Prince Saud.	April 21–22, 1991
32	Kuwait	Kuwait City	Discussed postwar economic assistance with the Amir and Crown Prince.	April 22, 1991
32	Syria	Damascus	Discussed the Middle East peace process with Foreign Minister Sharaa.	April 22–24, 1991
32	Soviet Union	Kislovodsk	Discussed the Middle East peace process and implementation of the CFE Treaty with Foreign Minister Bessmertnykh.	April 24–25, 1991
32	Israel	Jerusalem	Discussed the Middle East peace process with Prime Minister Shamir.	April 25–26, 1991
33	Syria	Damascus	Discussed the Middle East peace process with President Assad.	May 11–12, 1991
33	Egypt	Cairo	Discussed the Middle East peace process with President Mubarak and Soviet Foreign Minister Bessmertnykh.	May 12–14, 1991
33	Jordan	Amman	Discussed the Middle East peace process with King Hussein.	May 14, 1991
33	Israel	Jerusalem	Discussed the Middle East peace process with Prime Minister Shamir and senior Israeli officials.	May 14–16, 1991
34	Portugal	Lisbon	Witnessed the signing of the Angola Peace Accords.	May 31 – June 1, 1991
35	Denmark	Copenhagen	Attended NATO Ministerial Meeting.	June 5–7, 1991
35	Switzerland	Geneva	Met with Soviet Foreign Minister Bessmertnykh.	June 7, 1991
36	Germany	Berlin, Halle	Attended CSCE Foreign Ministers' Meeting and discussed strategic arms reductions with Soviet Foreign Minister Bessmertnykh.	June 17–21, 1991
36	Yugoslavia	Belgrade	Met with Prime Minister Marković and with the presidents of the 6 republics.	June 21–22, 1991
36	Albania	Tirana	Met with President Alia and senior officials; addressed the Albanian Parliament.	June 22, 1991
37	United Kingdom	London	Attended Economic Summit Meeting and accompanied President Bush to meetings with Soviet President Gorbachev.	July 15–18, 1991
37	Syria	Damascus	Discussed a Middle East peace conference with President Assad.	July 18–19, 1991
37	Egypt	Cairo, Alexandria	Discussed a Middle East peace conference with President Mubarak.	July 19–20, 1991
37	Saudi Arabia	Jeddah	Discussed a Middle East peace conference with King Fahd.	July 20–21, 1991
37	Jordan	Amman	Discussed a Middle East peace conference with King Hussein.	July 21, 1991
37	Israel	Jerusalem	Discussed a Middle East peace conference with Prime Minister Shamir, senior Israeli officials, and Palestinian representatives.	July 21–22, 1991
37	Malaysia	Kuala Lumpur	Attended meeting of ASEAN Foreign Ministers.	July 23–25, 1991
37	Mongolia	Ulaanbaatar	Met with senior Mongolian officials, addressed the Mongolian Parliament, and observed wildlife in the Gobi Desert.	July 25–29, 1991
37	Soviet Union	Moscow	Attended U.S.-Soviet Summit Meeting.	July 29 – August 1, 1991
37	Israel	Jerusalem	Discussed a Middle East peace conference with senior Israeli officials and Palestinian representatives.	August 1–2, 1991
37	Jordan	Amman	Discussed a Middle East peace conference with King Hussein and Foreign Minister Masri.	August 2–3, 1991
37	Morocco	Rabat	Discussed a Middle East peace conference with King Hassan II and Foreign Minister Abdellatif Filali.	August 3–4, 1991
37	Tunisia	Tunis	Discussed a Middle East peace conference with President Ben Ali and Foreign Minister Benyahia. Returned to Morocco afterwards.	August 4, 1991
37	Algeria	Algiers	Discussed a Middle East peace conference with President Bendjedid and Foreign Minister Ghozali.	August 5, 1991
38	Belgium	Brussels	Met with NATO Foreign Ministers to discuss the coup in the Soviet Union.	August 21–22, 1991
39	Mexico	Mexico City	Attended meeting of the U.S.-Mexico Binational Commission.	September 8–9, 1991
40	Soviet Union	Moscow, Saint Petersburg, Alma Ata	Met with senior officials of the Soviet Union, the Russian Republic, and Kazakhstan. Attended the CSCE Conference on the Human Dimension.	September 10–16, 1991
41	Estonia	Tallinn	Met with Chairman Ruutel and Prime Minister Savisaar.	September 14, 1991
41	Latvia	Riga	Met with President Gorbunovs and Prime Minister Godmanis.	September 14, 1991
41	Lithuania	Vilnius	Met with President Landsbergis and Prime Minister Vagnorius.	September 14, 1991
42	Israel	Jerusalem	Discussed a Middle East peace conference with senior Israeli officials and Palestinian representatives.	September 16–17, 1991
42	Egypt	Cairo	Discussed a Middle East peace conference with President Mubarak and Foreign Minister Amr Moussa.	September 17–18, 1991
42	Syria	Damascus	Discussed a Middle East peace conference with President Assad and Foreign Minister Sharaa.	September 18–19, 1991
42	Jordan	Amman	Discussed a Middle East peace conference with King Hussein.	September 19–20, 1991
42	Syria	Damascus	Discussed a Middle East peace conference with President Assad.	September 20, 1991
43	Egypt	Cairo	Discussed a Middle East peace conference with President Mubarak.	October 13–14, 1991
43	Jordan	Amman	Discussed a Middle East peace conference with King Hussein.	October 14–15, 1991
43	Syria	Damascus	Discussed a Middle East peace conference with President Assad.	October 15–16, 1991
43	Israel	Jerusalem	Discussed a Middle East peace conference with senior Israeli officials and Palestinian representatives. Also met with Soviet Foreign Minister Pankin and announced a Middle East Peace Conference.	October 16–19, 1991
43	Spain	Madrid	Discussed arrangements for a Middle East Peace Conference with senior Spanish officials.	October 19, 1991
44	France	Paris	Attended the signing of the Cambodian Comprehensive Peace Accords and discussed normalization of relations with Vietnamese Foreign Minister Nguyễn.	October 22–23, 1991
45	Spain	Madrid	Accompanied President Bush to a meeting with Soviet President Gorbachev and to the opening session of the Middle East Peace Conference.	October 29 – November 3, 1991
46	Italy	Rome	Accompanied President Bush to a NATO Summit Meeting.	November 6–8, 1991
46	Netherlands	The Hague	Accompanied President Bush to a European Community Summit Meeting.	November 8–9, 1991
47	Japan	Tokyo	Met with Prime Minister Miyazawa and Foreign Minister Watanabe.	November 10–12, 1991
47	South Korea	Seoul	Attended Asia-Pacific Economic Cooperation Conference.	November 12–15, 1991
47	China	Beijing	Met with CCP General Secretary Jiang Zemin, President Yang Shangkun and senior Chinese officials.	November 15–17, 1991
47	Soviet Union	Moscow	Met with senior Soviet and Russian officials.	December 15–17, 1991
47	Kyrgyzstan	Bishek	Met with President Akayev.	December 17, 1991
47	Kazakhstan	Alma Ata	Met with President Nazarbayev.	December 17, 1991
47	Belarus	Minsk	Soviet Chairman Shuskevich and Foreign Minister Kravchenko.	December 18, 1991
47	Ukraine	Kyiv	Met with President Kravchuk.	December 18–19, 1991
47	Belgium	Brussels	Attended NATO Ministerial Meeting and met with Foreign Ministers of the European Community.	December 19–21, 1991
48	Mexico	Mexico City	Attended the signing of the Salvadoran Peace Treaty.	January 16, 1992
48	El Salvador	San Salvador	Addressed the Salvadoran National Assembly.	January 16–17, 1992
48	Nicaragua	Managua	Met with President Chamorro.	January 17, 1992
49	Russia	Moscow	Attended Middle East peace conference.	January 27–29, 1992
49	Czechoslovakia	Prague	Attended CSCE Council of Ministers Meeting.	January 30, 1992
50	Germany	Frankfurt	Attended ceremonies inaugurating emergency aid to the former Soviet republics.	February 9–10, 1992
50	Moldova	Chișinău	Met with President Snegur.	February 11, 1992
50	Armenia	Yerevan	Met with President Ter-Petrossian.	February 11–12, 1992
50	Azerbaijan	Baku	Met with President Mutəllibov and discussed possible establishment of diplomatic relations.	February 12, 1992
50	Tajikistan	Dushanbe	Met with President Nabiyev and discussed possible establishment of diplomatic relations.	February 12, 1992
50	Turkmenistan	Ashgabat	Met with President Niyazov	February 12–13, 1992
50	Russia	Yekaterinburg, Chelyabinsk	Met with former Soviet nuclear scientists.	February 14–15, 1992
50	Uzbekistan	Tashkent, Samarkand	Met with President Karimov and Uzbek political leaders.	February 15–16, 1992
50	Russia	Moscow	Discussed strategic arms reductions with President Yeltsin and Foreign Minister Kozyrev.	February 16–18, 1992
51	Belgium	Brussels	Attended NATO Ministerial Meeting and met with North Atlantic Cooperation Council Foreign Ministers. Discussed peace-keeping efforts in Yugoslavia with European Community Foreign Ministers, and strategic arms reductions with Russian Foreign Minister Kozyrev.	March 9–11, 1992
52	United Kingdom	London	Met with Prime Minister Major.	May 22–23, 1992
52	Portugal	Lisbon	Attended Conference on Assistance to the New Independent States. Signed protocol making Russia, Belarus, Kazakhstan and Ukraine parties to the START Treaty.	May 23–24, 1992
52	Georgia	Tbilisi	Met with State Council Chairman Shevardnadze and Prime Minister Sigua.	May 25–26, 1992
53	United Kingdom	London	Discussed strategic arms reductions with Russian Foreign Minister Kozyrev.	June 11–12, 1992
54	Poland	Warsaw	Accompanied President Bush on a visit.	July 5, 1992
54	Germany	Munich	Accompanied President Bush to the Economic Summit Meeting and to meetings with Russian President Yeltsin.	July 5–8, 1992
54	Finland	Helsinki	Accompanied President Bush to the CSCE Summit Meeting.	July 8–10, 1992
55	Israel	Jerusalem	Discussed the Middle East peace process with Prime Minister Rabin, Israeli officials, and Palestinian representatives.	July 19–21, 1992
55	Jordan	Amman	Discussed the Middle East peace process and the Iraq crisis with King Hussein.	July 21, 1992
55	Syria	Damascus	Discussed the Middle East peace process and the Iraq crisis with President Assad.	July 21–22, 1992
55	Egypt	Cairo	Discussed the Middle East peace process and the Iraq crisis with President Mubarak.	July 22, 1992
55	Syria	Damascus	Discussed the Middle East peace process and the Iraq crisis with President Assad.	July 22–23, 1992
55	Lebanon	Zahle	Discussed the Middle East peace process and the Taif Accord with President Hrawi.	July 23, 1992
55	Saudi Arabia	Jeddah	Discussed the Middle East peace process and the Iraq crisis with King Fahd and Foreign Minister Prince Saud.	July 23–24, 1992
55	Maldives	Malé	Met with President Gayoom en route to the Philippines.	July 24, 1992
55	Philippines	Manila	Attended ASEAN Post-Ministerial Conference.	July 25–26, 1992

== Warren Christopher ==
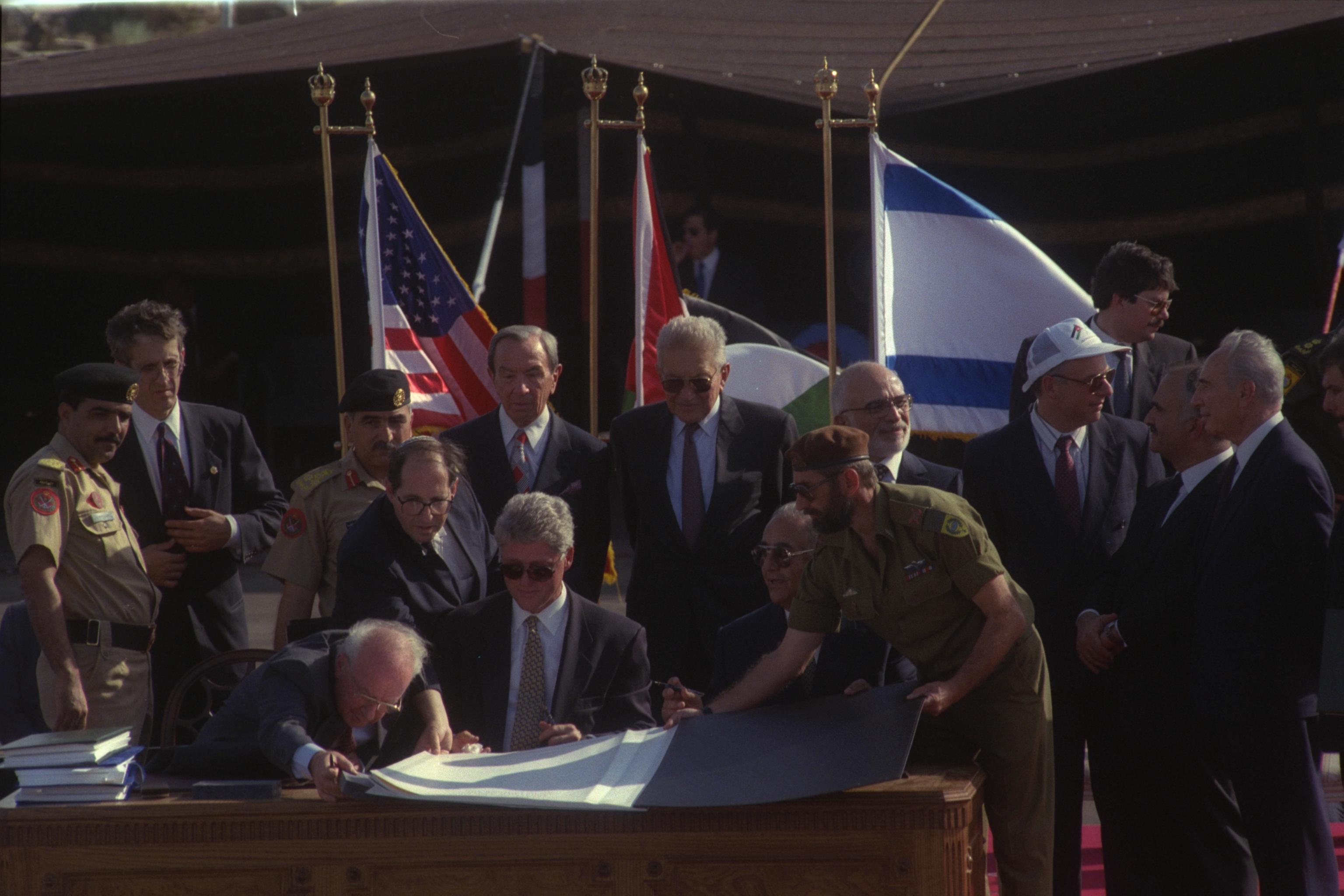
Secretary of State Warren Christopher (standing, center-left) looks on as the Israel–Jordan peace treaty is signed in 1994

== Madeleine Albright ==
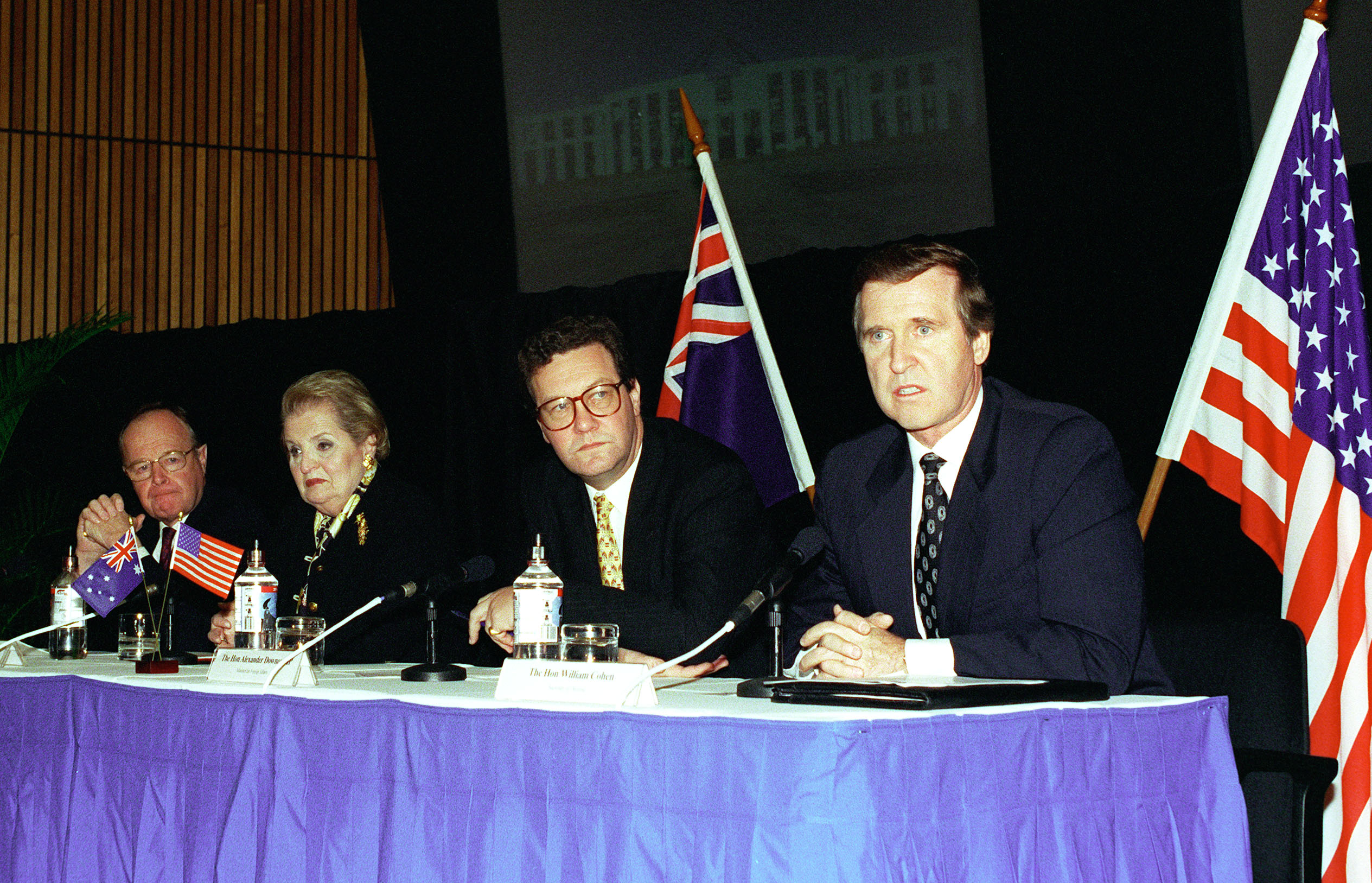
Secretary of State Madeleine Albright and Secretary of Defense William S. Cohen with Australian Minister of Defense Ian McLachlan and Australian Minister for Foreign Affairs Alexander Downer in Sydney, 1998

== Colin Powell ==
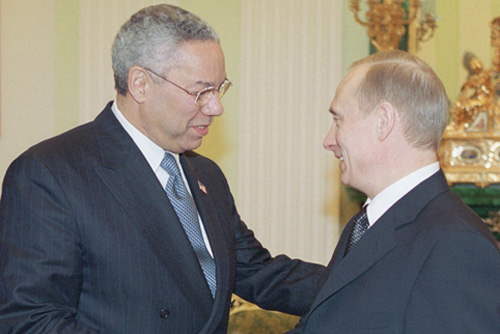
Secretary of State Colin Powell with Russian President Vladimir Putin in the Kremlin, 2001

== Condoleezza Rice ==
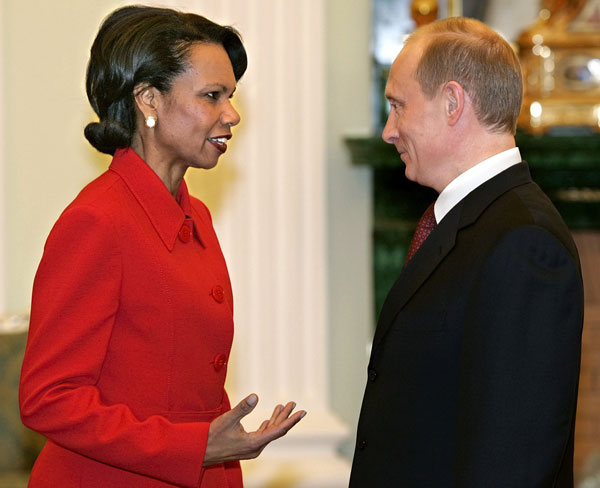
Secretary of State Condoleezza Rice with Russian President Vladimir Putin in the Kremlin, 2005

== Hillary Clinton ==
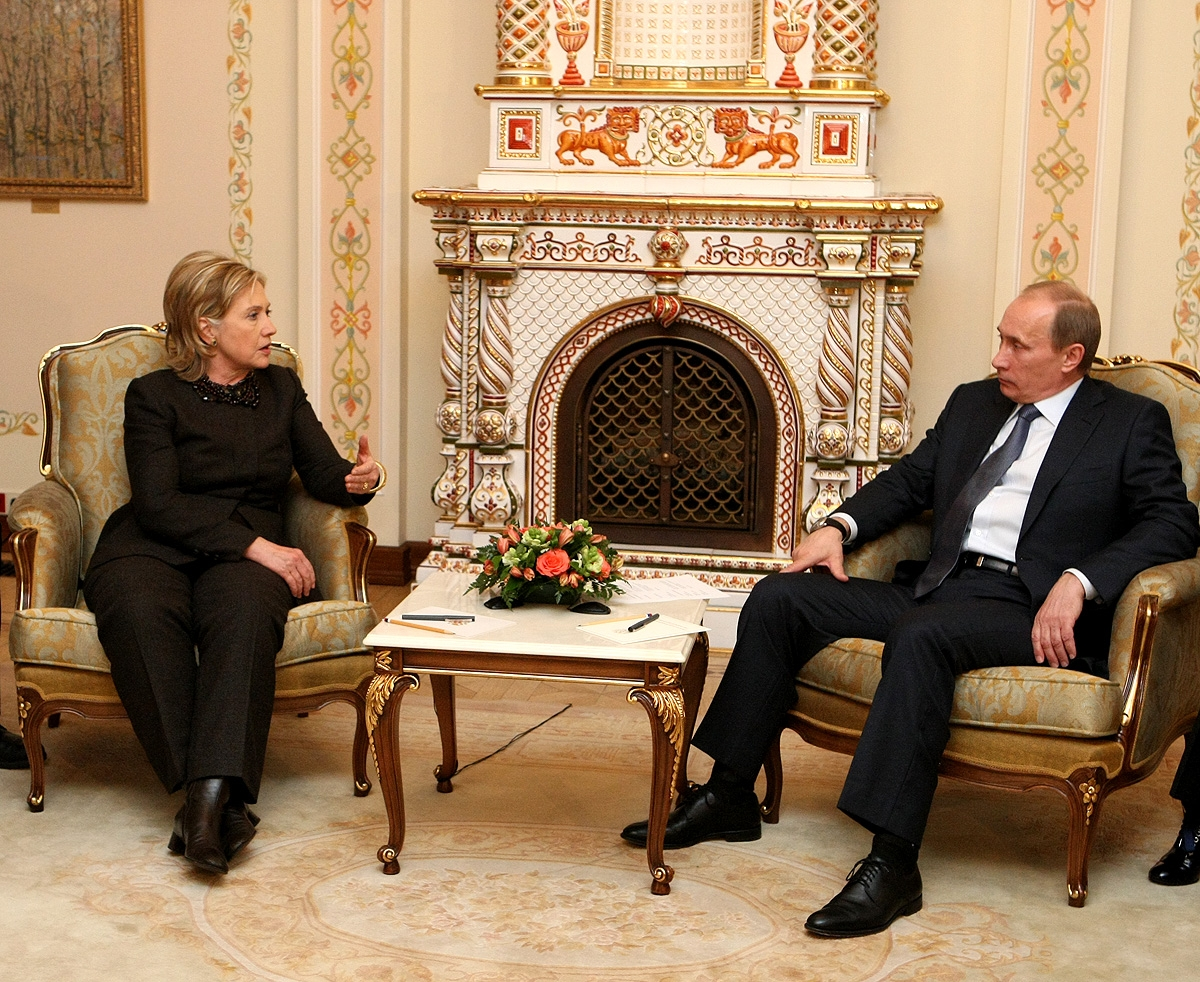
Secretary of State Hillary Clinton with Russian Prime Minister Vladimir Putin in the Kremlin, 2010

== John Kerry ==
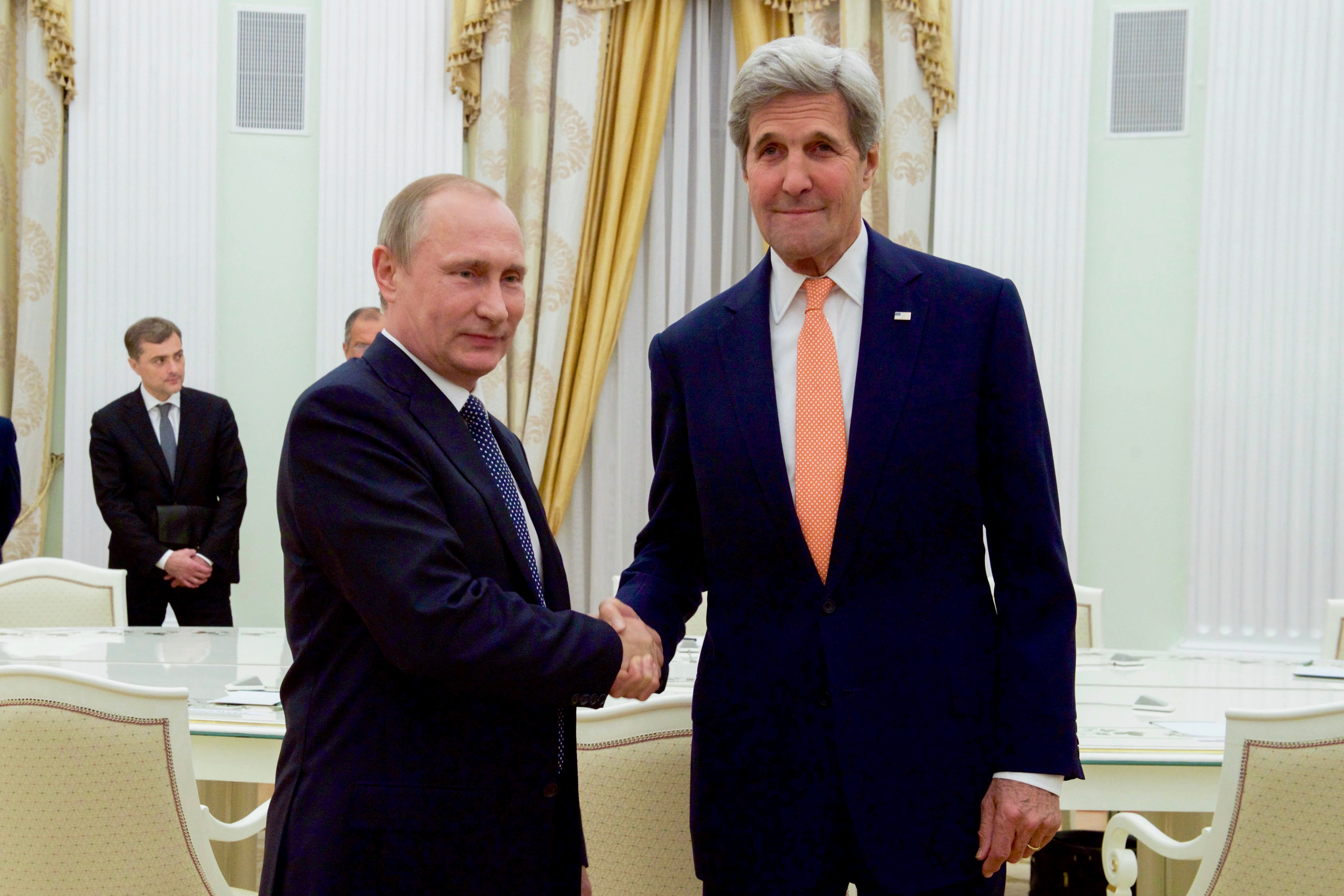
Secretary of State John Kerry with Russian President Vladimir Putin in the Kremlin, 2016

== Rex Tillerson ==
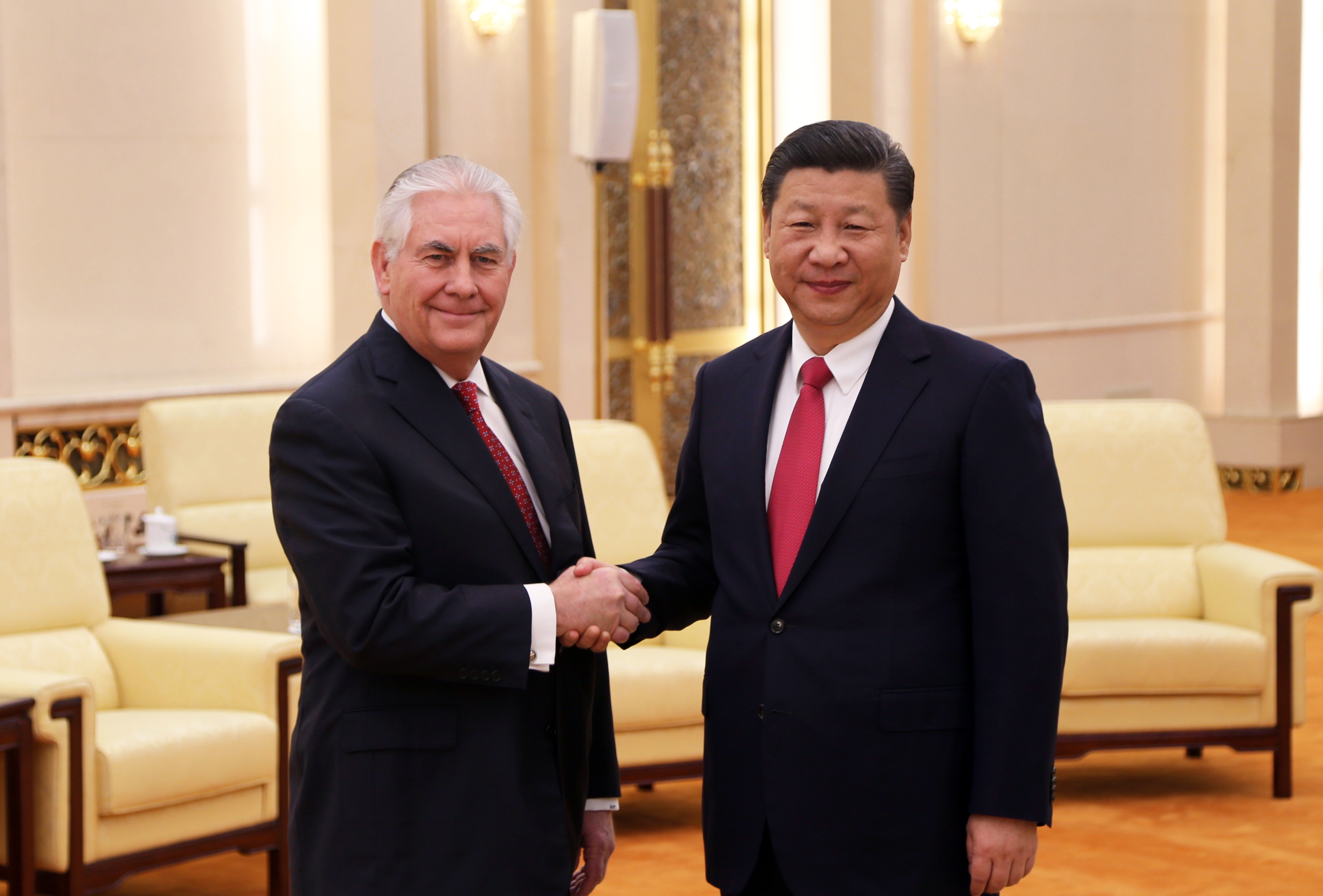
Secretary of State Rex Tillerson with Chinese leader and CCP General Secretary Xi Jinping in Beijing, March 2017

== Mike Pompeo ==
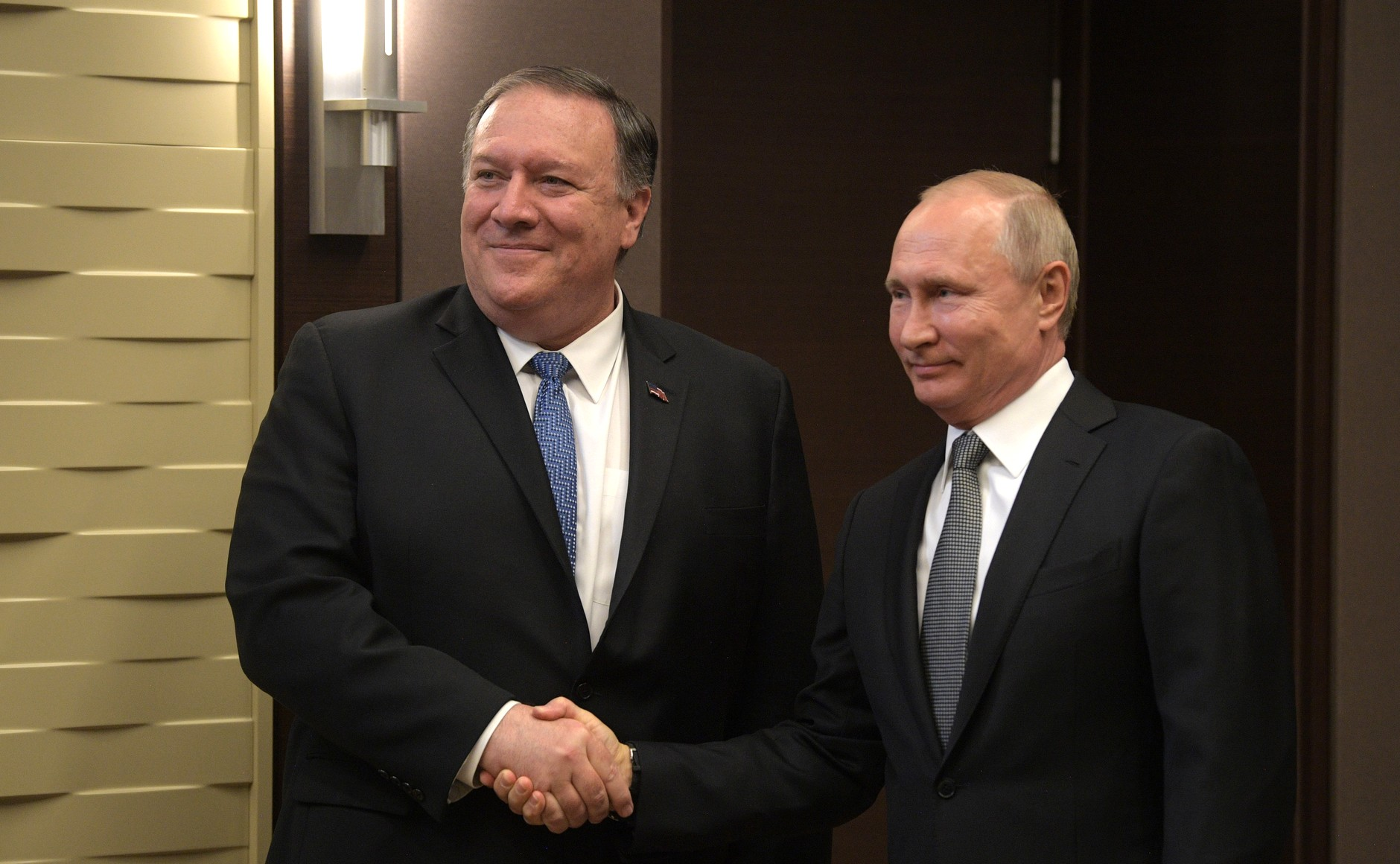
Secretary of State Mike Pompeo with Russian President Vladimir Putin in Sochi, May 2019

== Antony Blinken ==
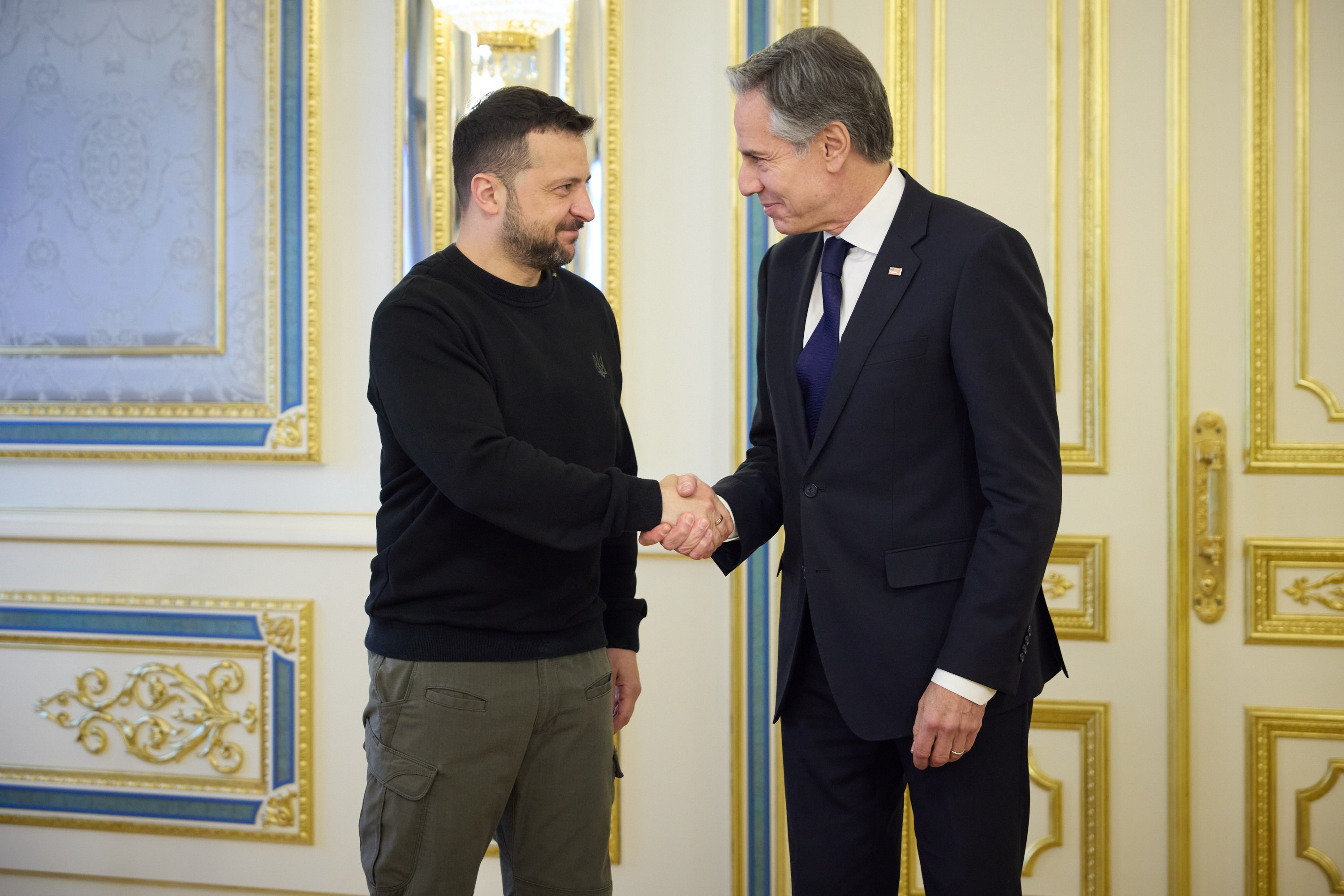
Secretary of State Antony Blinken with Ukrainian President Volodymyr Zelenskyy in Kyiv, May 2024

== Marco Rubio ==
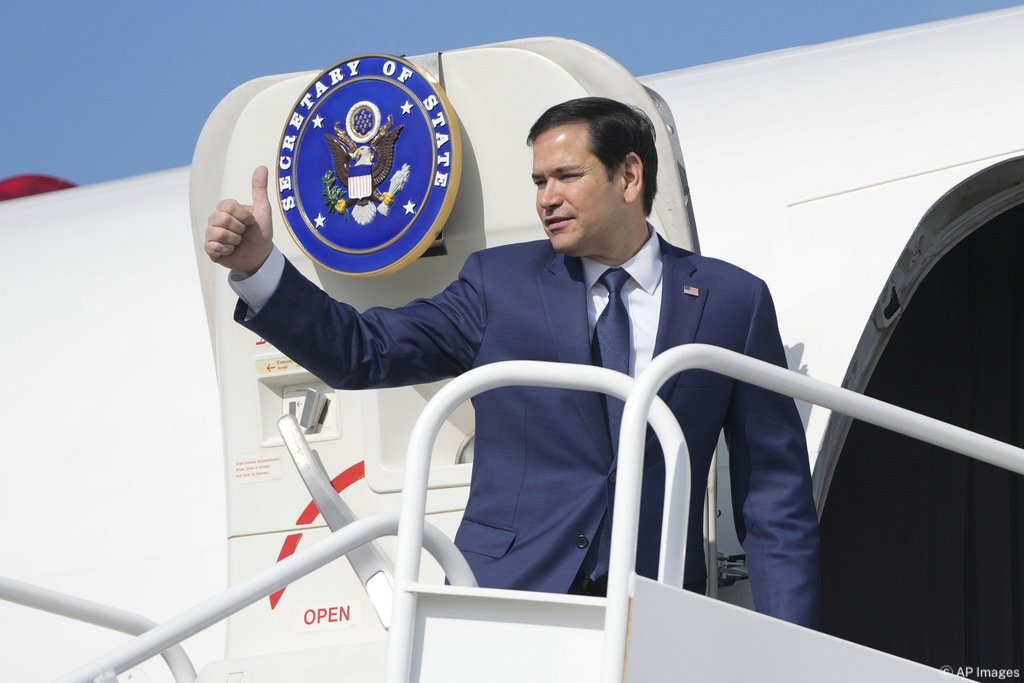
Secretary of State Marco Rubio boarding Air Force Three, February 2025
