= Helsinki Summit (1990) =

Meeting between George H. W. Bush and Mikhail Gorbachev in Helsinki on 9 September 1990

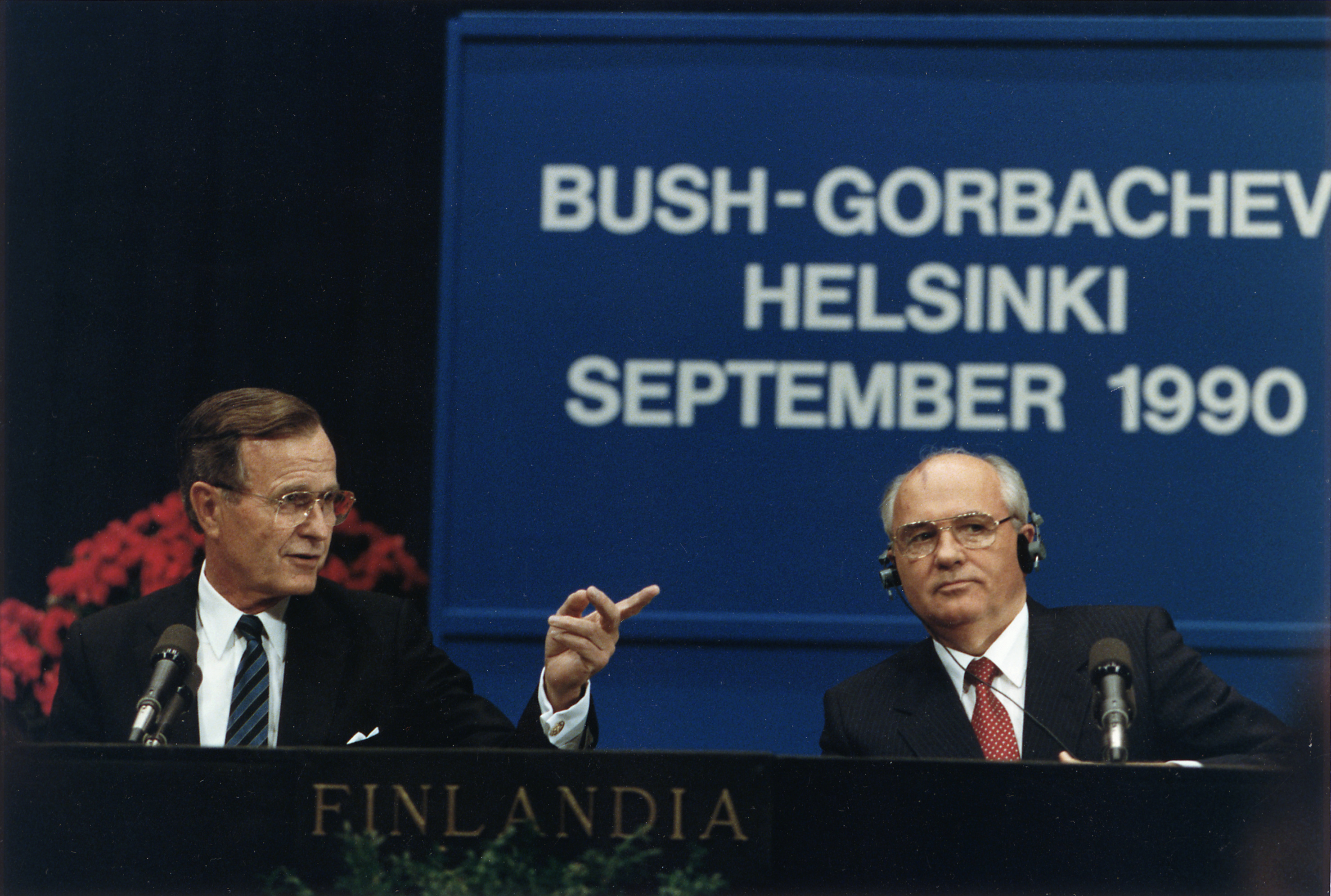
- Bush and Gorbachev at the Helsinki summit
- Host country: Finland
- Date: September 9, 1990
- Cities: Helsinki
- Venues: Finlandia Hall
- Participants: (Soviet Union) Mikhail Gorbachev (United States) George H. W. Bush
- Chair: President Mauno Koivisto
- Follows: Washington Summit (1990)

The Helsinki Summit was a private, bilateral meeting between American President George H. W. Bush and Soviet President Mikhail Gorbachev that took place in Helsinki, Finland on September 9, 1990. Due to the vested interests of both the Soviet Union and the United States in the Gulf Crisis' resolution, the August 1990 Iraqi invasion of Kuwait was the primary topic of discussion for the leaders during the Helsinki Summit. The concerted efforts at easing American-Soviet tensions in the aftermath of the Cold War was another prominent topic, among other notable current events. At the summit's conclusion, Presidents Bush and Gorbachev produced a document of joint statements that illuminated the areas in which the leaders had committed to aligning their foreign policy goals. The summit was followed by a press conference wherein members of the media questioned Presidents Bush and Gorbachev about the content of their meeting and the justifications for their joint statements.

Some experts understand the Helsinki Summit to represent one step in a sequence of meetings and agreements starting in the 1980s whereby the diplomatic transition toward relatively cooperative US-Soviet relations set the stage for a future US-Russian relationship.

== Historical context ==
Between 1985 and 1990, a series of bilateral conferences were held between the Soviet Union's General Secretary Mikhail Gorbachev and United States' Presidents Ronald Reagan and George H. W. Bush. At the outset of the mid-1980s, the burgeoning relationship between the Soviet Union (USSR) and the United States (US) was tenuous, yet hopeful. The success of the proceeding summits encouraged the gradual easing of political tensions between the Soviet Union and the United States post-Strategic Arms Limitation Talks (SALT II), and ultimately paved the way for the creation of the Helsinki Summit.

=== Geneva Summit (1985) ===
President Ronald Reagan and General Secretary Mikhail Gorbachev were officially acquainted at the Geneva Summit in 1985. Building off of previous SALT II negotiations between President Jimmy Carter and General Secretary Leonid Brezhnev, the two leaders began formal negotiations to establish Nuclear Risk Reduction Centers. In addition, the leaders discussed a potential plan to eliminate nuclear weapons and inhibit an arms race in space between the United States and Soviet Union. Gorbachev and Reagan called for decisive action on mutually agreed upon issues, particularly on the reduction in nuclear arms for both the United States and the Soviet Union. The summit's negotiations bolstered the Strategic Arms Reduction Talks (START I), which began in 1981 and thus initiated the possibility of nuclear arsenal reductions. Furthermore, the leaders agreed to the establishment of an interim Intermediate-Range Nuclear Forces Treaty (INF) agreement.

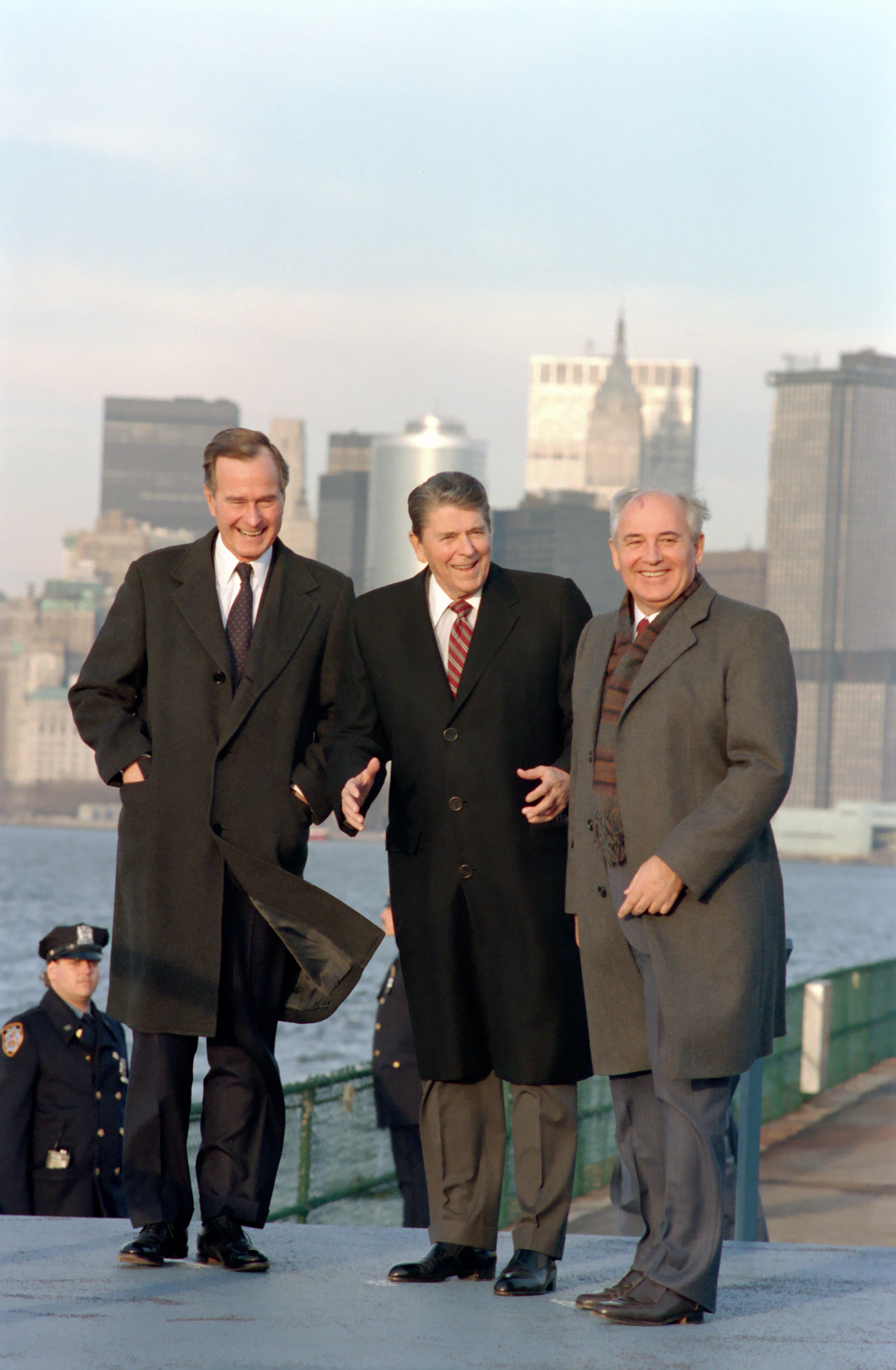
President Ronald Reagan and Vice President Bush Meet with Soviet General Secretary Gorbachev on Governors Island New York in 1988

In subsequent summits— Reykjavik Summit (1986), Washington Summit (1987), Moscow Summit (1988), and Governors Island Summit (1988)—President Reagan and General Secretary Gorbachev continued to negotiate agreements relating to mutual nuclear disarmament such as the Strategic Defense Initiative, the Anti-Ballistic Missile (ABM) Treaty, the Intermediate-Range Nuclear Forces (INF) Treaty, the Strategic Arms Reduction Talks (START) as well as limitations on nuclear testing.

=== Malta Summit (1989) ===
The Malta Summit in December 1989 represented a significant step forward in the development of US-Soviet relations, as explicitly mentioned by President Bush during the Helsinki Summit's press conference. As a result of the summit, President Bush and President Gorbachev had agreed to initiate a significant reduction in ground troops in Europe, as well as a reduction in weaponry. However, despite garnering theoretical support by both Presidents, the Conventional Armed Forces in Europe (CFE) and Strategic Arms Reduction Talks (START I) treaties wouldn't be settled until months following the Helsinki Summit. President Bush also stated that the United States would support granting the Soviet Union observer status at the General Agreement on Tariffs and Trade (GATT), a Western-dominated international trade organization, which provided the Soviet Union an important access point to trade with West. Mr. Gorbachev proclaimed that the legacy of the Malta Summit was so important, “that if it had not taken place, the world out there would be unrecognisable to the one we live in today” and assured that they will never start a hot war against the United States. The summit was also regarded by some to signify the end to the Cold War and the start of a brand new era in US-Soviet relations.

=== Invasion of Kuwait ===
On August 2, 1990, Iraqi President Saddam Hussein, ordered the invasion and occupation of Kuwait. The move would result in the issuance of United Nations Security Council Resolution 660 on the very same day, as well as an international effort to de-escalate the crisis. As two critical members of the United Nations Security Council, and as states with various political and economic interests in the region, the United States and the Soviet Union each had a vested interest in addressing the mounting crisis.

== Summit content ==
Emerging from the summit, Presidents Bush and Gorbachev produced a two-page document of joint statements regarding their various topics of conversation during their seven-hour private meeting.

Both the US and USSR supported proposed U.N. sanctions against Iraq and Iraqi withdrawal from Kuwait. With regards to Saddam's aggression, Presidents Bush and Gorbachev jointly stated:

"We are united in the belief that Iraq’s aggression will not be tolerated. No peaceful international order is possible if larger states can devour their smaller neighbors…Today, we once again call upon the government of Iraq to withdraw unconditionally from Kuwait, to allow the restoration of Kuwait’s legitimate government, and to free all hostages now held in Iraq and Kuwait."

Gorbachev’s support of US foreign policy regarding the invasion of Kuwait and Saddam Hussein’s aggression was observed as an important step in US-Soviet relations. As an anonymous Kremlin advisor expressed, "There is too much at stake in U.S.-Soviet relations for Gorbachev to risk opposing Bush on this."

While the summit's closed doors prevented the public from learning about the specific details of the pair's negotiations, the Presidents emerged from their meeting claiming a joint decision to prioritize a diplomatic solution to the Gulf Crisis. At a time when cyclical bread shortages had become commonplace in Moscow and US military operations like Operation Desert Shield were quickly racking up exorbitant amounts of government debt, some contemporaries have speculated that despite any possible desire to respond to the Iraqi invasion with military force, the move would have most likely been financially unfeasible.

Both leaders spoke in favor of establishing START; however, the pair had not yet agreed on a specific timeline at that time.

== Press conference ==
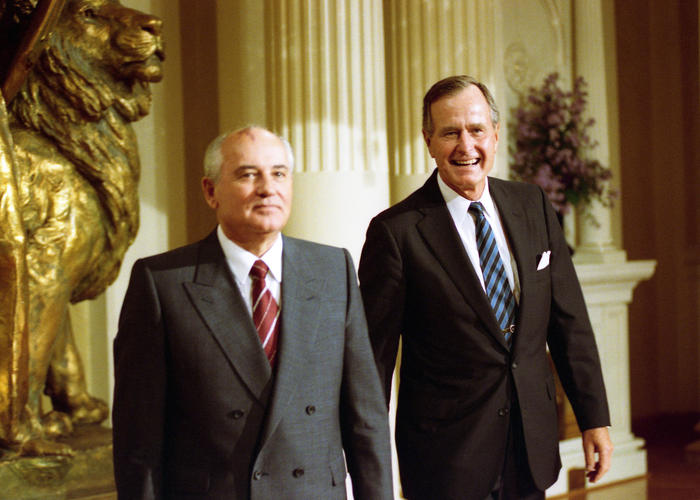
President George H. W. Bush and Mikhail Gorbachev pose for a photo during their meeting in Helsinki

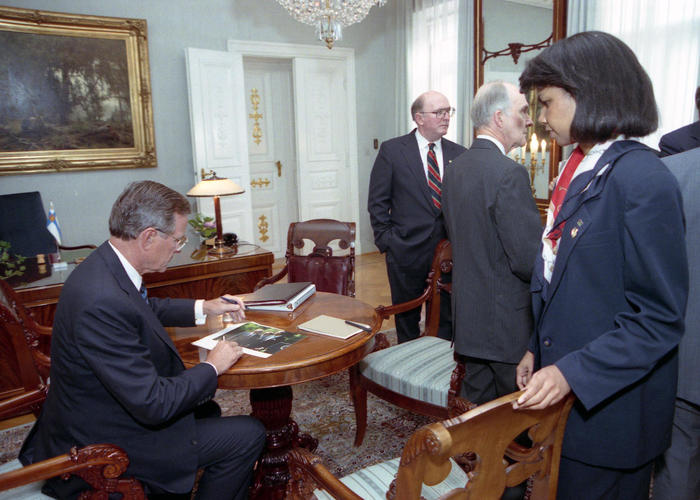
President George H. W. Bush meets with staff including Marlin Fitzwater, Brent Scowcroft, and Condoleezza Rice during the Summit in Helsinki, Finland, President Bush and President Gorbachev subsequently held a press conference to conclude their bilateral summit.

=== The Gulf War ===
Questions regarding American and Soviet involvement in the Iraqi situation were among the most prominent questions of the event and were raised by multiple journalists. On the subject, President Bush and President Gorbachev expressed relatively unified views. The Presidents' answers both drew heavily from the joint statement that the two had just released, which called for Iraq to comply with the United Nations Resolution 660 for a peaceful de-escalation of tensions in the Persian Gulf. President Bush stated that American military forces will occupy the Persian Gulf, "as long as is required", with the intention of withdrawing as soon as possible.

During the conference, the two Presidents were adamant that military intervention was not an option that either leader was willing to discuss to the media. On the subject, President Bush stated that the pair hadn't discussed military options during their meeting and that a diplomatic solution to the Gulf Crisis was the extent to which the US was willing to consider. President Gorbachev echoed this sentiment, claiming that, "the whole of the discussion was for a political solution, which would also compliment the actions already taken by the rest of the international community" and that the Soviet Union would, "limit ourselves to that political solution". Throughout the rest of the conference, both Presidents would reiterate to various members of the press the primacy of a diplomatic solution in their joint efforts to bring the crisis to a conclusion.

=== US-Soviet relations ===
Another notable topic of discussion raised by multiple reporters revolved around the progress of US-Soviet political and economic cooperation. To the question regarding the state of their relations, President Gorbachev said of the current summit that "this is the test of the durability of the new approach to solving world problems…what we have seen today is that we have confirmed the most important progress in recent time." With regards to President Gorbachev's reorientation of the Soviet Union's economic policies according to the principles of Perestroika and Glasnost, Gorbachev explained that the new economic trajectory of the Soviet Union was one aspect of an overarching intention to engage in amicable relations with the international community on multiple levels:

"This is becoming a normal element of the new kind of cooperation in trade, technology, and human exchange. All of these elements characterize the peaceful period upon which we have just embarked and must get used to."

=== Palestinian statehood ===
Two separate questions regarding Palestine were brought into the discussion. One reporter asked about the possibility of the United States and the Soviet Union addressing Palestinian calls for statehood within peace talks with Iraq. Another reporter asked both Presidents about the logic behind their concerted efforts at addressing the UN resolution condemning Iraqi aggression while other UN resolutions condemning aggressions have been left unattended, specifically the UN Resolution 242 which called for a withdrawal of Israeli forces from occupied Palestinian territories following the 1967 Six-Day War. President Bush's responses indicated that the US considered the Palestinian question of statehood to be distinct from and irrelevant to the Gulf Crisis negotiations. President Bush stated that the US supported the UN Resolution 242 and was "committed to seeing that resolution through, [however] the US will not sit by while a naked aggression against Kuwait is taking place". President Gorbachev responded to the question by acknowledging that there was a "link" between the nature of the Gulf Crisis and the protracted Israeli-Palestinian conflict; and therefore, that the resolution of both crises were of "equal concern" to the Soviet Union.

== Follow up and future implications ==
Only a few days after the Helsinki Summit, on the 12th of September, the Treaty on the Final Settlement with Respect to Germany to restore sovereign status to a reunited Germany was signed in Moscow by the US, USSR, France, West and East Germany. Germany was officially reunified that October, which was celebrated by the United States and the Soviet Union alike.

As a continuation of the summit in Helsinki, the following conference that included Presidents Bush and Gorbachev took place in November 1990 in Paris. The conference included 34 nations, each a part of the Conference on Security and Cooperation in Europe (CSCE). The conference resulted in the signing of the Conventional Armed Forces in Europe (CFE) treaty by members of NATO and the Warsaw Pact. The states of the CSCE also made arrangements to hold similar high-level political meetings on a regular basis, to build upon efforts to prevent conflict, control arms and safeguard elections within these countries.

Following the conference, while global media coverage generally regarded the United States as being more inclined to engage the Iraqi conflict with military force, the Soviet Union was viewed as favouring punitive trade embargoes to complement their diplomatic efforts at de-escalation.

== See also ==
- Soviet Union–United States relations
- Finland–Russia relations
- Finland–United States relations
- Cold War (1985–91)
- Soviet Union–United States summits
- Malta Summit
- START I
- 2018 Russia–United States Summit
- New world order (politics)
