= Will Englund =

American journalist (born 1953)

William A. Englund
- Born: March 30, 1953 (age 73); New York, U.S.
- Education: A.B., Harvard College, M.S., Columbia University Graduate School of Journalism
- Employer: The Washington Post
- Title: Energy reporter for Business
- Spouse: Kathy Lally
- Awards: 1998 Pulitzer Prize

William A. Englund (born March 30, 1953) is an American journalist and author. He has spent over four decades in the news business, most of those with The Baltimore Sun. He is currently with The Washington Post.

He completed three tours as a foreign correspondent to Russia, in Moscow. In 1993, he was summoned by a Russian investigator for questioning; he was denied access to his attorney and an interpreter during the inquiry. The incident was the first time an American reporter had been summoned in seven years. He is currently with The Washington Post.

In 2017, Englunds' book, "March 1917: On the Brink of War and Revolution" was published by W. W. Northern & Company.

Englund is a native of Pleasantville, New York. He graduated from Harvard College with an A.B. in English and a M.S. from the Columbia University Graduate School of Journalism.

== Career ==
Englund gained his first experience in journalism, while working for The Record, in Bergen County, New Jersey. He spent a year there, before leaving to work for The Baltimore Sun in 1977.

At The Baltimore Sun, he was an editorial writer and an associate editor. Englund and his wife, Kathy Lally, worked for the Glasgow Herald as part of a Fulbright scholarship to the United Kingdom in 1988. They were foreign correspondents to Russia, in Moscow for The Sun; their first tour was from 1991–1995 and the second tour from 1997–2001.

in 1993, during their first overseas tour, Englund found himself summoned and questioned by a Russian investigator, Viktor Shkarin. Englund was denied, council, a U.S. diplomat, and an interpreter for the hour-long inquiry. He, and multiple news organizations, including his employer, The Baltimore Sun maintained that the incident was the result of a series of stories that he had written about Russia's chemical weapons program. At the time, Shkarin was investigating Vil Mirzayanov, a Soviet chemist. The incident was the first time an American reporter was summoned for questioning since 1986, when Nicholas Daniloff, was questioned and arrested on espionage charges, before being released in exchange for the release of Gennadi Zakharov, who was detained in the U.S.

In 2003, Englund wrote about the perspective of Islam in Russia along with the desperate situations of Chernobyl veterans in Ukraine.

Englund worked as a White House correspondent, from 2008–2010 for the National Journal, before leaving to work for The Washington Post.

Englund and his wife finished their third tour as Moscow correspondents for The Washington Post in May 2014. That same year, Englund was assigned as an editor on Foreign. Prior to his arrival, changes to the way foreign reporting had been made were well underway.

It began in 2013 when Jeff Bezos, was extremely impressed with the reporting by a digital journalist, "9 questions about Syria you were too embarrassed to ask." The article received over three million pageviews on WorldViews, a foreign news blog, and correspondents at the Post, were encouraged to participate. At the time, Englund's wife, who was serving as the bureau chief in Moscow, expressed skepticism about writing for the blog; her chief concern was about how time consuming it could become, along with their other reporting responsibilities.

Englund shot his own photographs and video, which he would file along with his narrative. Editors would compile the footage with his reporting, creating powerful stories like "Behind the Barricades in Ukraine." When interviewed in 2015, Englund and his wife both agreed that they missed "the good old days" of reporting; Englund commented further, saying '"It can be satisfying to be quick with a story, but it's not terribly rewarding"..."being enslaved by the Web hugely reduces our ability to explore and dig and do the other acts essential to quality journalism.'" The Washington Post launched its own news blog in 2017.

In December 2019, Englund was named as The Washington Post's new energy reporter for Business. The press release describes his new duties at the position as:

"He will be tasked with crafting enterprise and accountability stories on a beat that ranges from the oil fields of Saudi Arabia and Russia to the agencies that set U.S. policy. He will track energy companies, which are some of the biggest in the economy and are influential in Washington. And he we will work with the reporters on National to cover how these corporations respond to climate change and other environmental challenges."

Englund had been in Moscow since July, filling in until a new bureau chief could be chosen.

Englund has appeared on C-SPAN multiple times.

== Awards ==
Englund was the recipient of the 1998 Pulitzer Prize for investigative reporting, with Gary Cohn, for "Shipbreakers" a series of stories on the shipbreaking industry and the health and safety hazards that salvage workers faced due to lack of training. The series of reports by Englund, (with Gary Cohen and Perry Thorsvik) also received The Whitman Bassow Award, 1997, from the Overseas Press Club, and the George Polk Award for Environmental Reporting in the same year.
