= Reykjavík Summit =

Unsuccessful 1986 Soviet-American diplomatic summit

Coordinates: 64°08′47″N 21°54′24″W

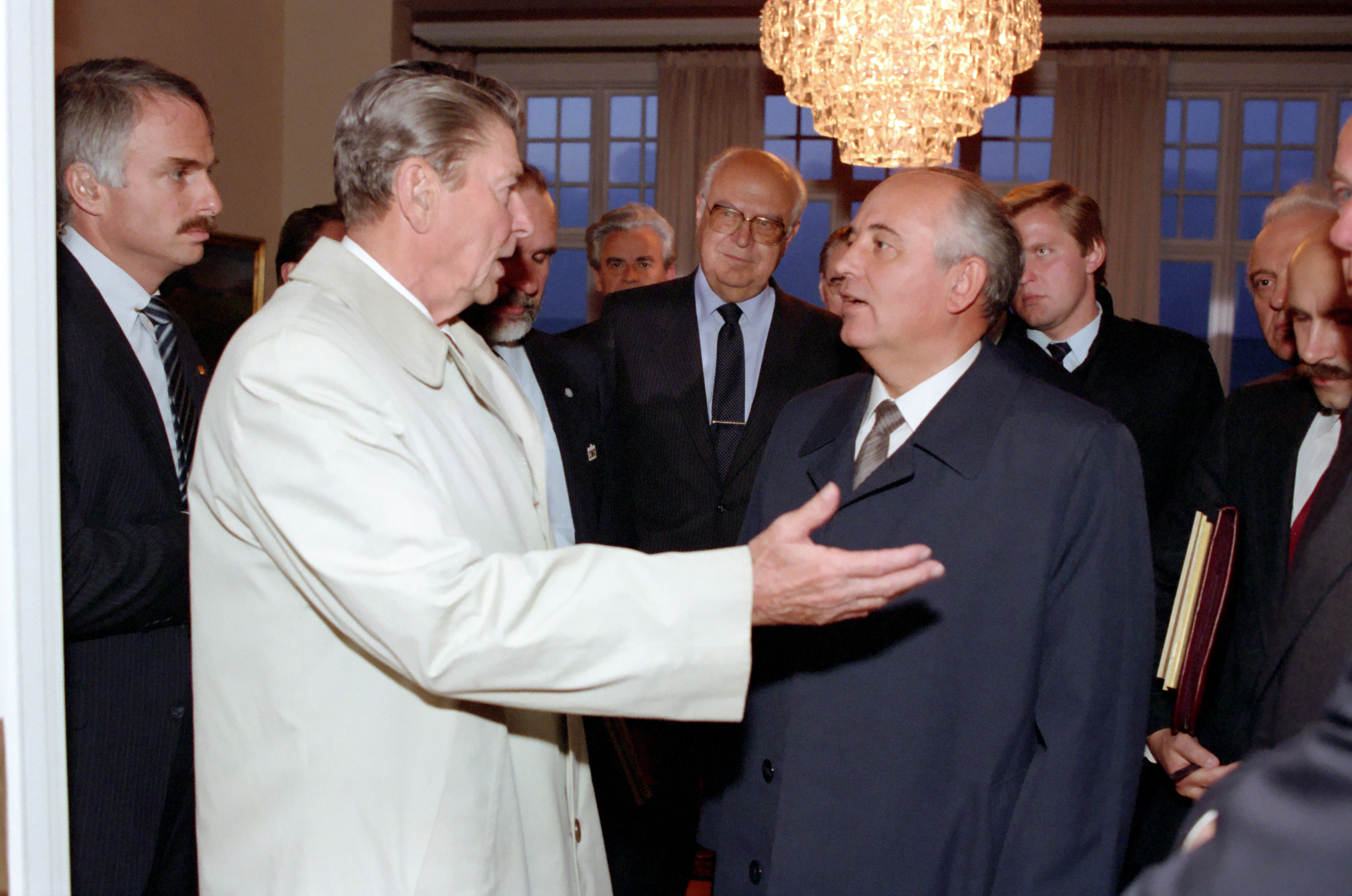
- Reagan and Gorbachev in Höfði
- Host country: Iceland
- Date: October 11–12, 1986
- Cities: Reykjavík
- Venues: Höfði
- Participants: (Soviet Union) Mikhail Gorbachev (United States) Ronald Reagan
- Follows: Geneva Summit (1985)
- Precedes: Washington Summit (1987)

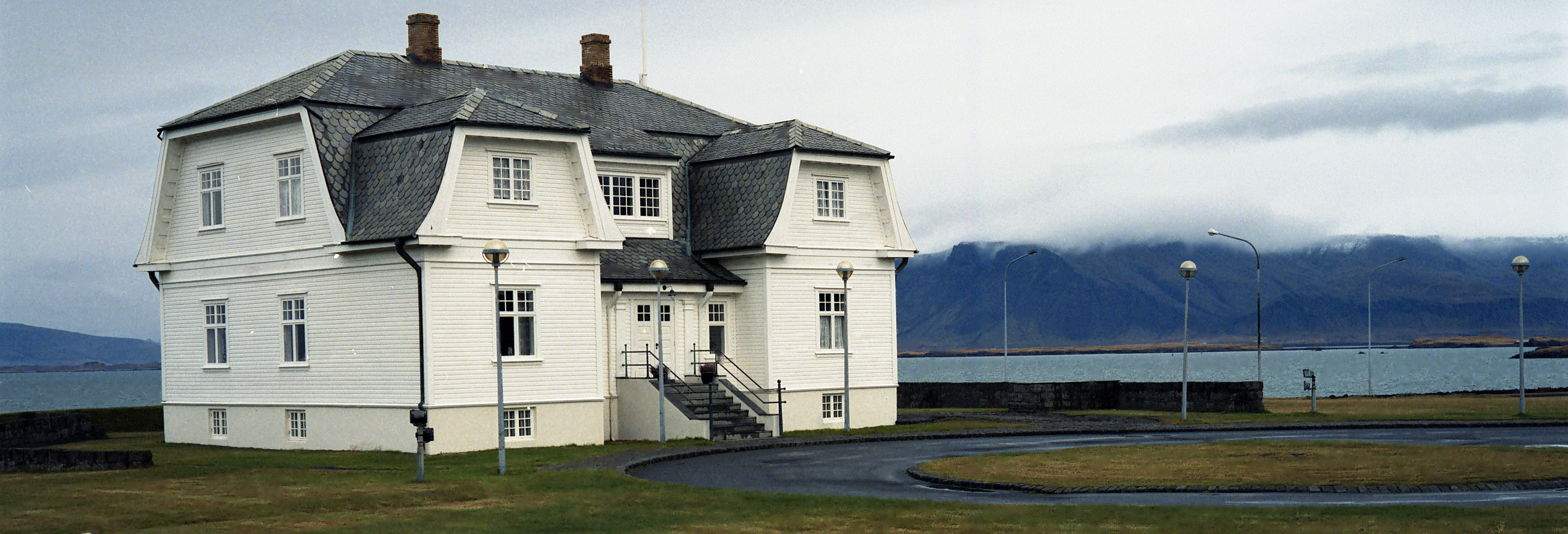
The former French consulate and British embassy, called Höfði, was the site of the Reykjavík Summit in 1986.

The Reykjavík Summit was a summit meeting between U.S. president Ronald Reagan and Soviet general secretary Mikhail Gorbachev, held in Reykjavík, Iceland, on 11–12 October 1986. The talks collapsed at the last minute, but the progress that had been achieved eventually resulted in the 1987 Intermediate-Range Nuclear Forces Treaty between the United States and the Soviet Union.

== Background ==
In mid-September 1986, Gorbachev wrote to Reagan proposing a meeting in Iceland the following month to discuss arms controls ahead of a more substantive summit (which was subsequently the Washington Summit in December 1987). Reagan agreed and the arrangements were made in an unusually short period of time. The meeting took place shortly after a diplomatic crisis involving alleged espionage conducted by the Soviet physicist Gennadi Zakharov in the US and the American journalist Nicholas Daniloff in the Soviet Union, both being released without charge before the summit.

== Negotiations ==
Since 1986, Gorbachev had proposed banning all ballistic missiles, but Reagan wanted to continue research on the Strategic Defense Initiative (SDI), which involved the militarization of outer space. Yet Soviet suspicion of SDI continued, and US–Soviet relations were strained.

At Reykjavík, Reagan sought to include discussion of human rights, emigration of Soviet Jews and dissidents, and the Soviet invasion of Afghanistan. Gorbachev sought to limit the talks solely to arms control. The Soviets acceded to the "double-zero" proposal for eliminating INF weapons from Europe, as initially proposed by President Reagan in November 1981 (INF denoting "Intermediate-Range Nuclear Forces" as distinct from ICBMs, or intercontinental ballistic missiles). The Soviets also proposed to eliminate 50% of all strategic arms, including ICBMs, and agreed not to include British or French weapons in the count. All this was proposed in exchange for an American pledge not to implement strategic defences for the next ten years, in accordance with SALT I.

The Americans countered with a proposal to eliminate all ballistic missiles within ten years, but required the right to deploy strategic defences against remaining threats afterwards. Gorbachev then suggested eliminating all nuclear weapons within a decade. Gorbachev, however, citing a desire to strengthen the Anti-Ballistic Missile Treaty (ABM Treaty), added the condition that any SDI research be confined to laboratories for the ten-year period in question. Reagan argued that his proposed SDI research was allowed by any reasonable interpretation of the ABM treaty, and that he could not forget the pledge he made to Americans to investigate whether SDI was viable. He also promised to share SDI technology, a promise which Gorbachev said he doubted would be fulfilled, as the Americans would not even share oil-drilling technology.

Some, including Reagan staffer and shortly his ambassador to the USSR Jack F. Matlock Jr., attribute Reagan's refusal to compromise on SDI testing to a mistaken belief that the proposed restrictions would be detrimental to the program, whereas in reality, Matlock contends, they would have had little effect on research that was still in its very early stages.

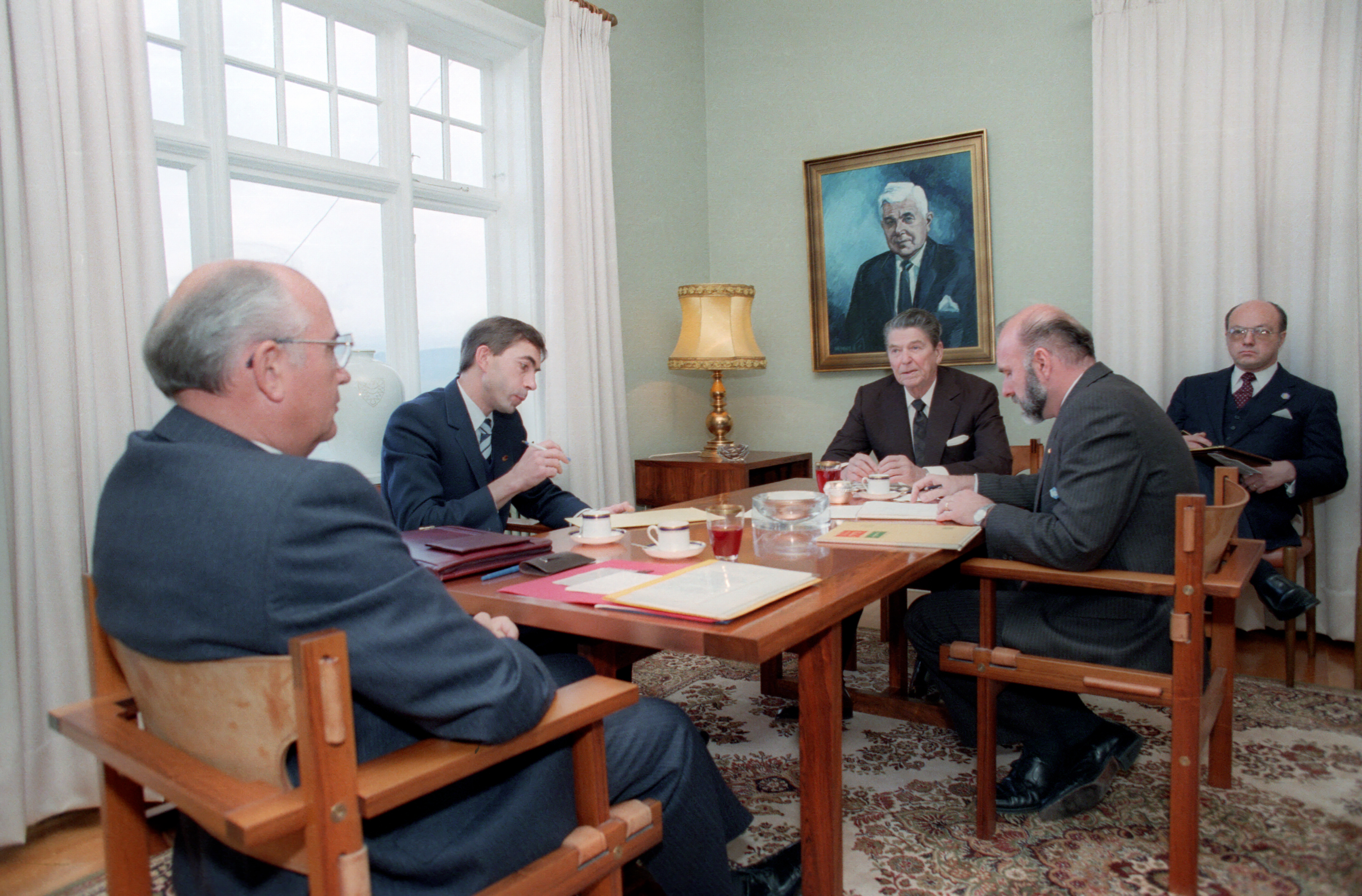
Negotiations.

The talks finally stalled, with President Reagan asking if General Secretary Gorbachev would "turn down a historic opportunity because of a single word", referring to his insistence on laboratory testing. Gorbachev asserted that it was a matter of principle, and the summit concluded. A photograph taken of the two departing Höfði House portrays a visibly-angered Reagan and a solemn Gorbachev.

== Result ==
Despite getting unexpectedly close to the potential elimination of all nuclear weapons, the meeting adjourned with no agreement; however, both sides discovered the extent of the concessions the other side was willing to make. Human rights became a subject of productive discussion for the first time. An agreement by Gorbachev to on-site inspections, a continuing American demand which had not been achieved in the Partial Test Ban Treaty of 1963 or the ABM and SALT I pacts of 1972, constituted a significant step forward.

Despite its apparent failure, participants and observers have referred to the summit as an enormous breakthrough which eventually facilitated the INF Treaty (Intermediate-Range Nuclear Forces Treaty), signed at the Washington Summit on 8 December 1987.

== Key statements related to the summit ==
No.	Name of the document	United Nations Documents symbol (General Assembly)	United Nations Documents symbol (Security Council)
1	Radio address to the nation delivered by the President of the United States of America, Ronald Reagan, on the meeting with Soviet General Secretary Gorbachev in Reykjavik, Iceland, on 04 October 1986	no data	no data
2	Remarks by the President of the United States of America, Ronald Reagan, to American military personnel and their families in Keflavik, Iceland, on 12 October 1986	no data	no data
3	Press conference given by the General Secretary of the Central Committee of the Communist Party of the Soviet Union, Mikhail Gorbachev, in Reykjavík on 12 October 1986	A/41/709	S/18401
4	Address to the Nation on the Meetings With Soviet General Secretary Gorbachev in Iceland on 13 October 1986	A/41/807	S/18451
5	Speech given by the General Secretary of the Central Committee of the Communist Party of the Soviet Union, Mikhail Gorbachev, on Soviet television on 14 October 1986	A/41/714	S/18403
6	Remarks and a question-and-answer session by the President of the United States of America, Ronald Reagan, with broadcast journalists on the meetings in Iceland with Soviet General Secretary Gorbachev on 14 October 1986	no data	no data
7	Remarks by the President of the United States of America, Ronald Reagan, at a meeting with officials of the State Department and the U.S. Arms Control and Disarmament Agency on the meetings in Iceland with Soviet General Secretary Gorbachev on 14 October 1986	no data	no data
8	Speech given by the General Secretary of the Central Committee of the Communist Party of the Soviet Union, Mikhail Gorbachev, on Soviet television on 22 October 1986	A/41/759	S/18422

== In popular culture ==
The Reykjavík Summit was portrayed in the American film The Brink of War, directed by Michael Russell Gunn and starring Jeff Daniels as Ronald Reagan and Jared Harris as Mikhail Gorbachev.

== See also ==
- Iceland in the Cold War
- List of Soviet Union–United States summits
- Nuclear disarmament

== Sources ==
- Gaddis, John Lewis. The United States and the end of the cold war : implications, reconsiderations, provocations (New York: Oxford University Press, 1992), 128–29.
- Garthoff, Raymond L. The great transition: American-Soviet relations and the end of the Cold War (Brookings Institution, 1994). pp 252–99.
- Graebner, Norman A., Richard Dean Burns, and Joseph M. Siracusa. Reagan, Bush, Gorbachev : revisiting the end of the Cold War (Westport, Connecticut: Praeger Security International, 2008), 93–95.
- Matlock Jr., Jack F. Reagan and Gorbachev: how the Cold War ended (New York: Random House, 2004).
- McCauley, Martin. Russia, America, and the cold war, 1949–1991 (New York: Longman, 1998), 69.
- Powaski, Ronald E. The Cold War: the United States and the Soviet Union, 1917–1991 (New York: Oxford University Press, 1998), 254–55.
- Adelman, Kenneth L. (2014). Reagan at Reykjavik: Forty-Eight Hours that Ended the Cold War (1st ed.). New York: Broadside Books. ISBN 9780062310194.
