= List of Soviet Union–United States summits =

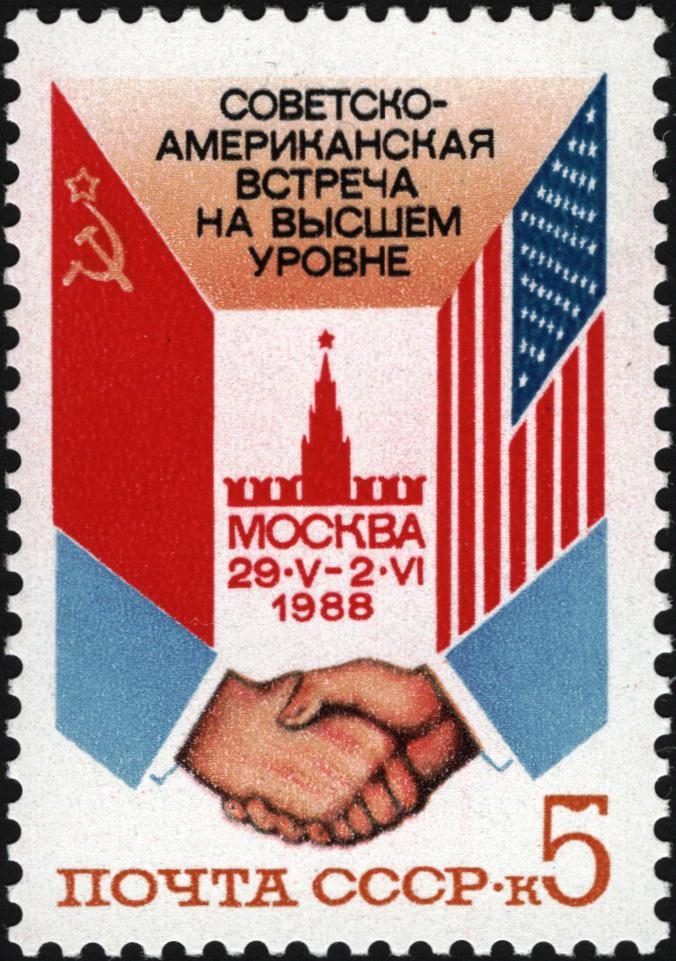
Moscow Summit (1988) postage stamps, Spasskaya Tower and handshake

Soviet Union–United States summits were held from 1943 to 1991. The topics discussed at the summits between the president of the United States and either the general secretary or the premier of the Soviet Union ranged from fighting the Axis powers during World War II to arms control between the two superpowers themselves during the Cold War, to the December 1990 declaration that the Cold War had ended, and the six implementing follow-ups prior to the December 1991 dissolution of the Soviet Union.

== World War II / Allies of World War II ==
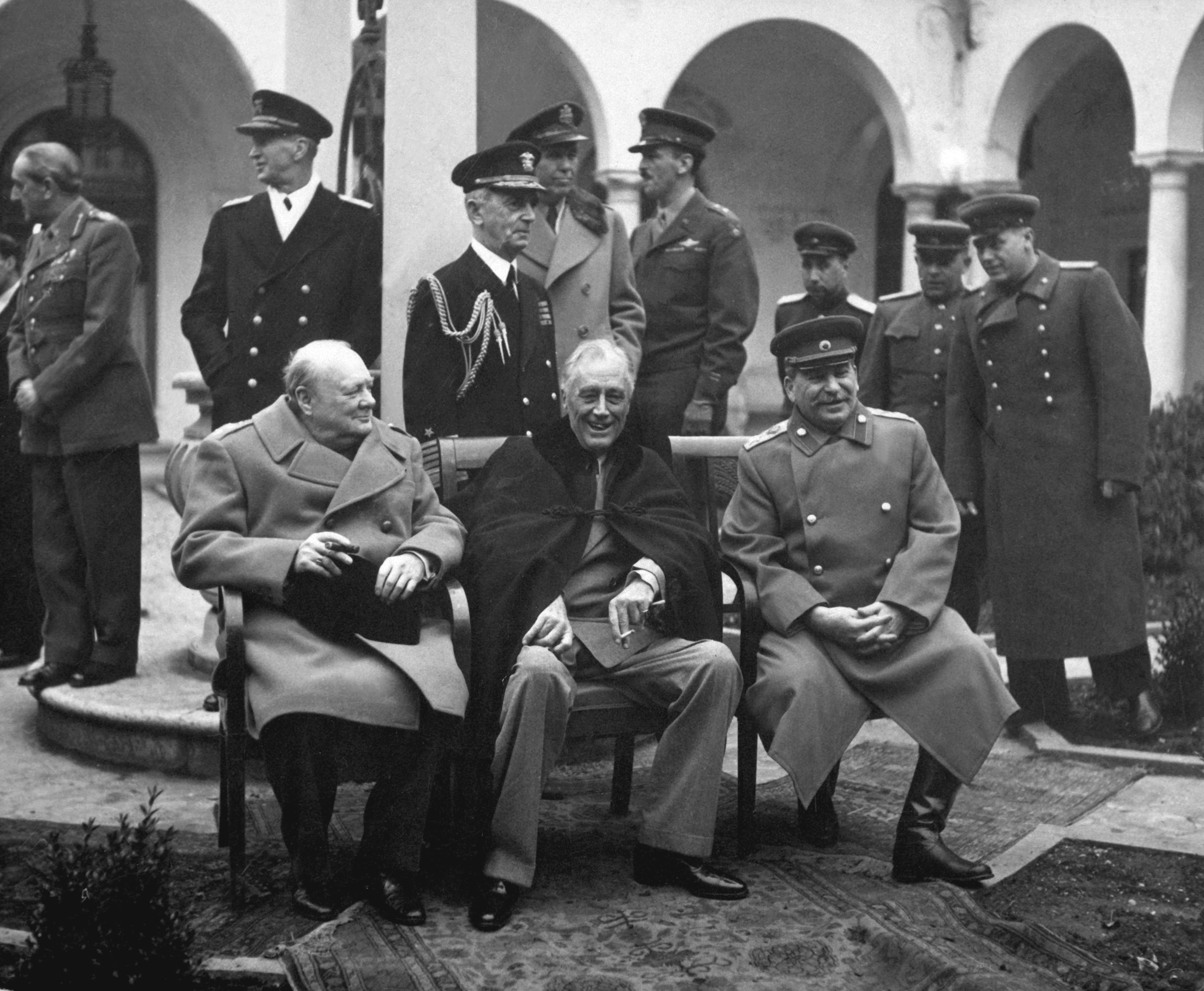
The "Big Three" Allied leaders (left to right) at the Yalta Conference, February 1945: Winston Churchill, Franklin D. Roosevelt and Joseph Stalin.

Clement Attlee, Harry S. Truman and Joseph Stalin at the Potsdam Conference, July 1945.

| Date | Place | Country | President of the United States | General Secretary or Premier of the Soviet Union | Notes |
|---|---|---|---|---|---|
| November 28 – December 1, 1943 | Tehran | Iran | Franklin D. Roosevelt | Joseph Stalin | Main article: Tehran Conference Held at the Soviet Embassy in Tehran. Also in attendance Prime Minister Winston Churchill of the United Kingdom. Ended with the Western Allies committing themselves to open a second front against Nazi Germany through the planned amphibious invasion of Normandy. They also agreed to provide full support to the Yugoslav Partisans over the Chetniks. In return, the Soviet Union agreed to support the creation of the United Nations after the war and eventually enter the Allied campaign against Japan. They also agreed to divide Germany into occupation zones and recognize Iran as an independent state after the war. |
| February 4 – 11, 1945 | Yalta | Soviet Union | Franklin D. Roosevelt | Joseph Stalin | Main article: Yalta Conference Held at the Livadia Palace. Also in attendance Prime Minister Winston Churchill of the United Kingdom. First visit by a United States President to the Soviet Union. Produced declaration calling for the formation of democratic institutions in Europe after the war while dividing Germany and Berlin into American, British, French, and Soviet zones of occupation. Imposed reparations, denazification, and demilitarization on postwar Germany. Obtained Western recognition of Soviet puppet government in Poland. Obtained Soviet commitment to enter the United Nations in exchange for allowing all 16 Soviet Socialist Republics membership. Mandated trials for Nazi war criminals after the war. |
| July 17 – August 2, 1945 | Potsdam | Allied-occupied Germany | Harry S. Truman | Joseph Stalin | Main article: Potsdam Conference Held at the Cecilienhof Palace in the Soviet occupation zone. Also in attendance Prime Ministers Winston Churchill and Clement Attlee of the United Kingdom, with a switch caused by the Labour Party's victory in the 1945 general election. Planned for the postwar order and terms of peace treaties after World War II. Mandated complete abolition of Nazi political institutions and laws in Germany, initiated democratization reforms, and planned dismantlement of industry. Set the Oder-Neisse line as the western border of Poland and Germany. Allowed expulsions of ethnic Germans from Eastern Europe. Created conditions which allowed the Soviet Union to establish satellite states in Eastern Europe after the war. |

== Cold War ==
=== Cold War (1953–1962) ===
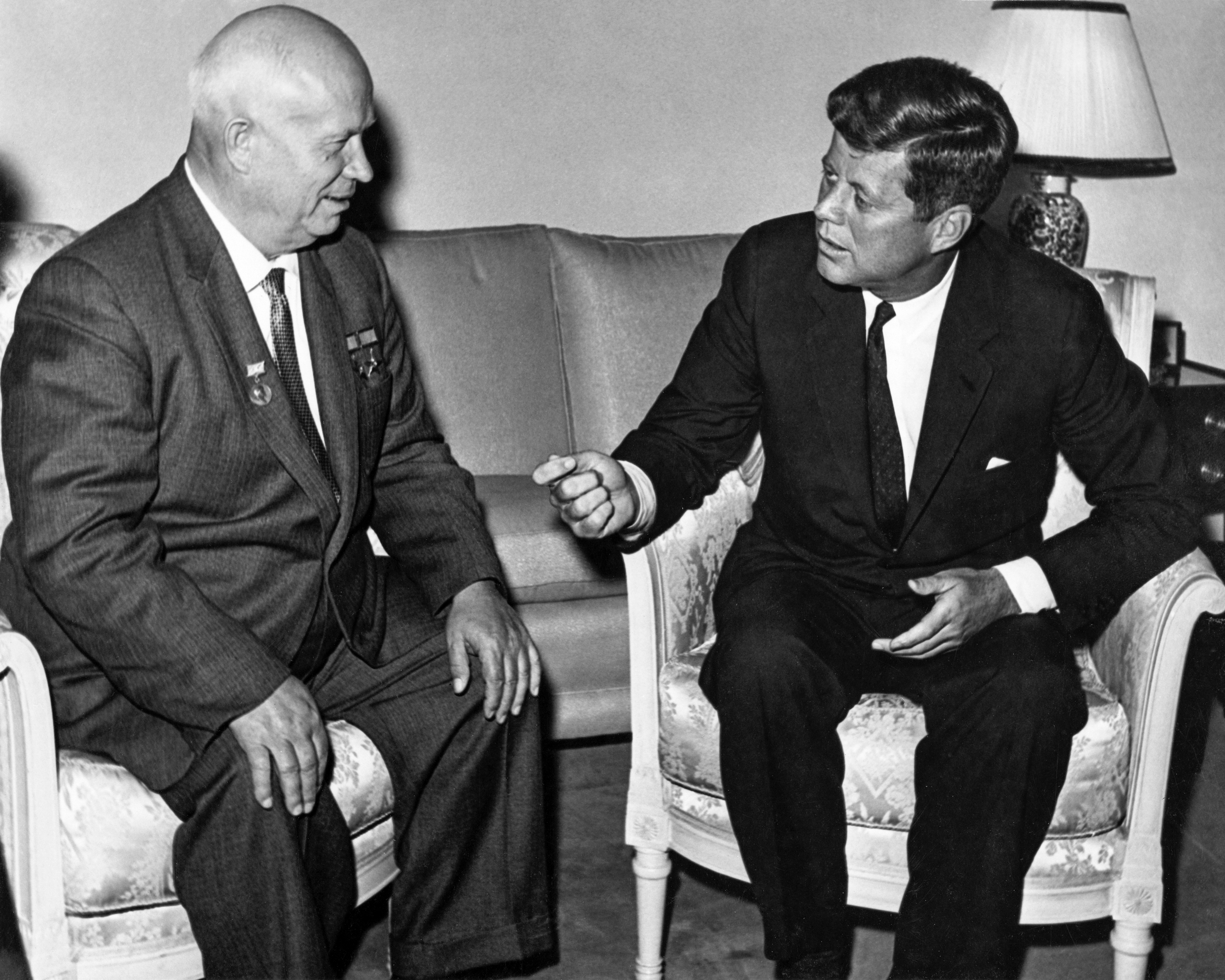
Nikita Khrushchev meeting John F. Kennedy at the Vienna Summit, June 1961

| Date | Place | Country | President of the United States | General Secretary or Premier of the Soviet Union | Notes |
|---|---|---|---|---|---|
| July 18–23, 1955 | Geneva | Switzerland | Dwight D. Eisenhower | Nikita Khrushchev and Nikolai Bulganin | Main article: Geneva Summit (1955) Also in attendance Prime Minister Anthony Eden of the United Kingdom and Prime Minister Edgar Faure of France. First Four-Power conference since World War II. It was intended to reduce rising international tensions during the Cold War, and included discussions of trade policy, the nuclear arms race, and disarmament. Failed to achieve settlement on German reunification due to Western refusal to withdraw West Germany from NATO. |
| September 15 and 27, 1959 | Washington, D.C., and Camp David | United States | Dwight D. Eisenhower | Nikita Khrushchev | Main article: State visit by Nikita Khrushchev to the United States First visit by a Soviet leader to the United States. |
| May 16–17, 1960 | Paris | France | Dwight D. Eisenhower | Nikita Khrushchev | Also in attendance Prime Minister Harold Macmillan of the United Kingdom and President Charles de Gaulle of France. Khrushchev left the summit due to the dispute over the 1960 U-2 incident. |
| June 3–4, 1961 | Vienna | Austria | John F. Kennedy | Nikita Khrushchev | Main article: Vienna Summit Convened after the botched Bay of Pigs invasion and the Berlin Crisis. Achieved a settlement on the Laotian Civil War but failed to achieve final settlement regarding the status of Berlin. The breakdown of the conference contributed to a more hardline American stance towards the Soviet Union. |

=== Cold War (1962–1979) ===
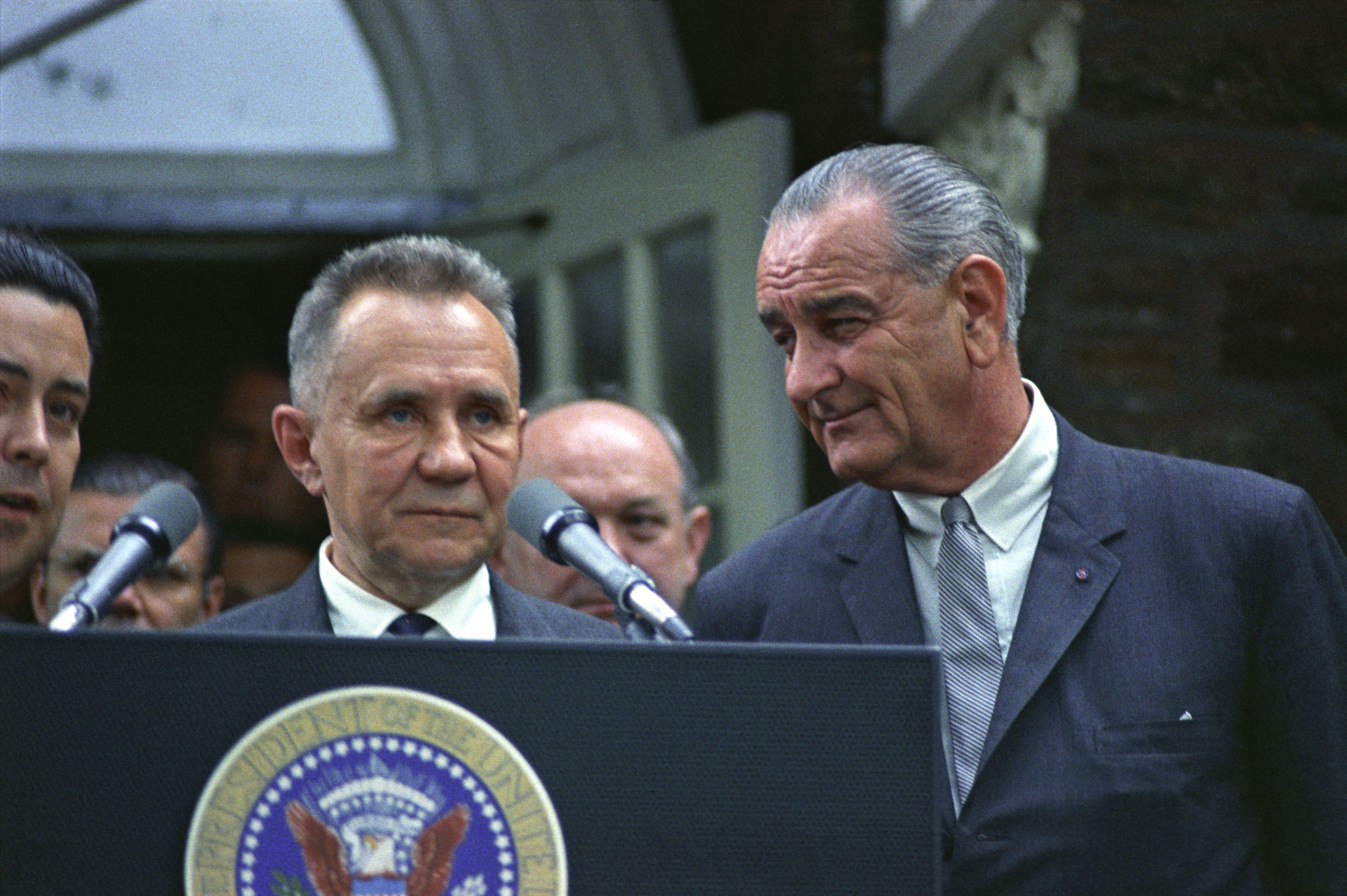
Alexei Kosygin with U.S. President Lyndon B. Johnson at the summit

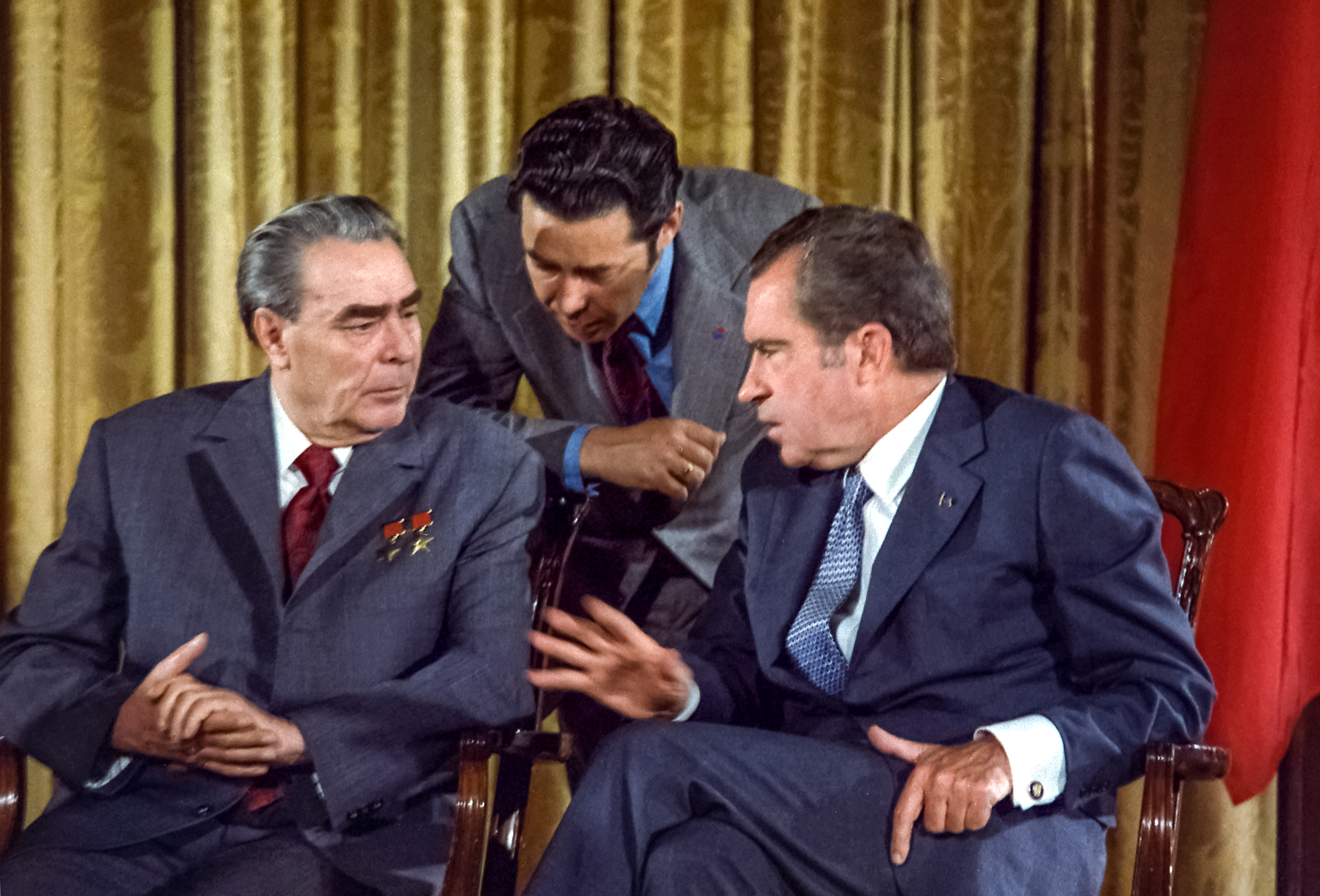
Leonid Brezhnev meets with Richard Nixon during the Soviet leader's trip to the U.S. in June 1973

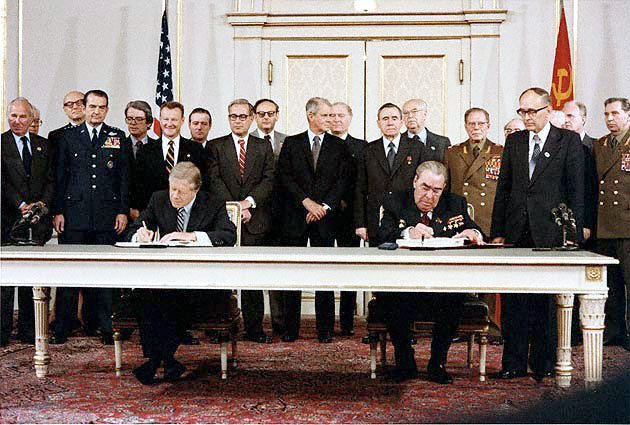
Jimmy Carter and Leonid Brezhnev signing SALT II Treaty, June 18, 1979, in Vienna

| Date | Place | Country | President of the United States | General Secretary or Premier of the Soviet Union | Notes |
|---|---|---|---|---|---|
| June 23 and 25, 1967 | Glassboro | United States | Lyndon B. Johnson | Alexei Kosygin | Main article: Glassboro Summit Conference Held at Hollybush Mansion in Glassboro State College. Convened due to the intensifying Vietnam War and the Six-Day War. Failed to reach concrete agreements but resulted in improved Soviet Union–United States relations and the period of détente |
| May 22–30, 1972 | Moscow | Soviet Union | Richard Nixon | Leonid Brezhnev and Alexei Kosygin | Main article: Moscow Summit (1972) First visit by an American head of state to the Soviet Union since World War II. Held at the Kremlin Palace. Signing of the Anti-Ballistic Missile (ABM) Treaty, the first Strategic Arms Limitation Treaty (SALT I), and the U.S.–Soviet Incidents at Sea Agreement. The treaties limited strategic nuclear weapons and specifically anti-ballistic missiles |
| June 18–25, 1973 | Washington, D.C. | United States | Richard Nixon | Leonid Brezhnev and Alexei Kosygin | Main article: Washington Summit (1973) Signing of the Agreement on the Prevention of Nuclear War at the White House. |
| June 28 – July 3, 1974 | Moscow | Soviet Union | Richard Nixon | Leonid Brezhnev | Main article: Moscow Summit (1974) Ended in the signing of the Threshold Test Ban Treaty limiting nuclear weapons tests. |
| November 23–24, 1974 | Vladivostok | Soviet Union | Gerald Ford | Leonid Brezhnev | Main article: Vladivostok Summit Meeting on Arms Control Held at the Okenskaya Sanitorium. Ended in agreement establishing parity for strategic nuclear delivery vehicles, including intercontinental ballistic missiles and submarine-launched ballistic missiles with multiple independently targetable reentry vehicles |
| July 30 and August 2, 1975 | Helsinki | Finland | Gerald Ford | Leonid Brezhnev | Main article: Helsinki Accords Final phase of the Conference on Security and Co-operation in Europe. Established the Organization for Security and Co-operation in Europe and the Moscow Helsinki Group. Included commitments from the United States, the Soviet Union, and most of Europe to support their territorial integrity |
| June 15–18, 1979 | Vienna | Austria | Jimmy Carter | Leonid Brezhnev | Signing of the second Strategic Arms Limitation Treaty (SALT II) at the Hofburg Palace. |

=== Cold War (1985–1991) ===
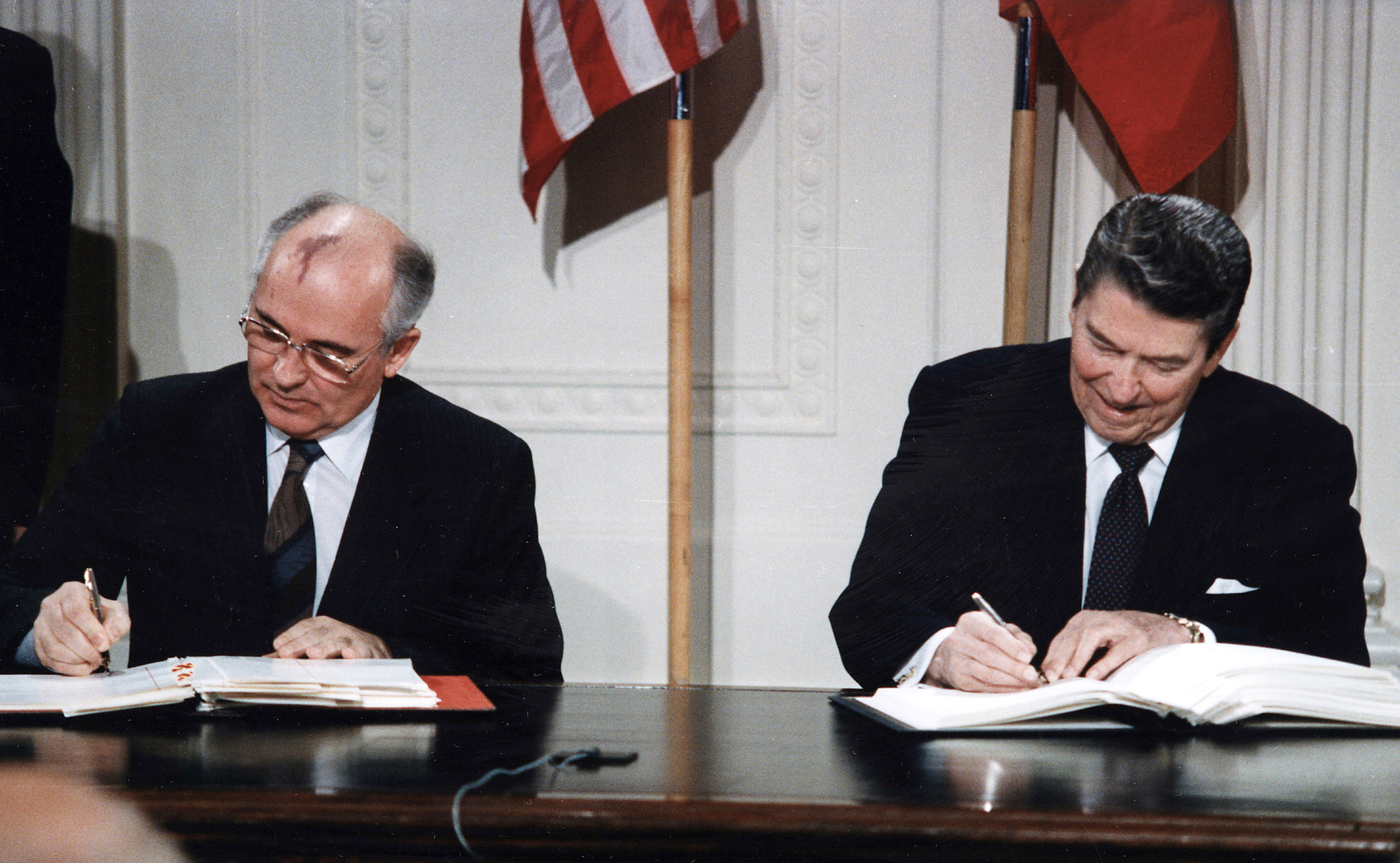
Mikhail Gorbachev and Ronald Reagan sign the INF Treaty at the White House in December 1987

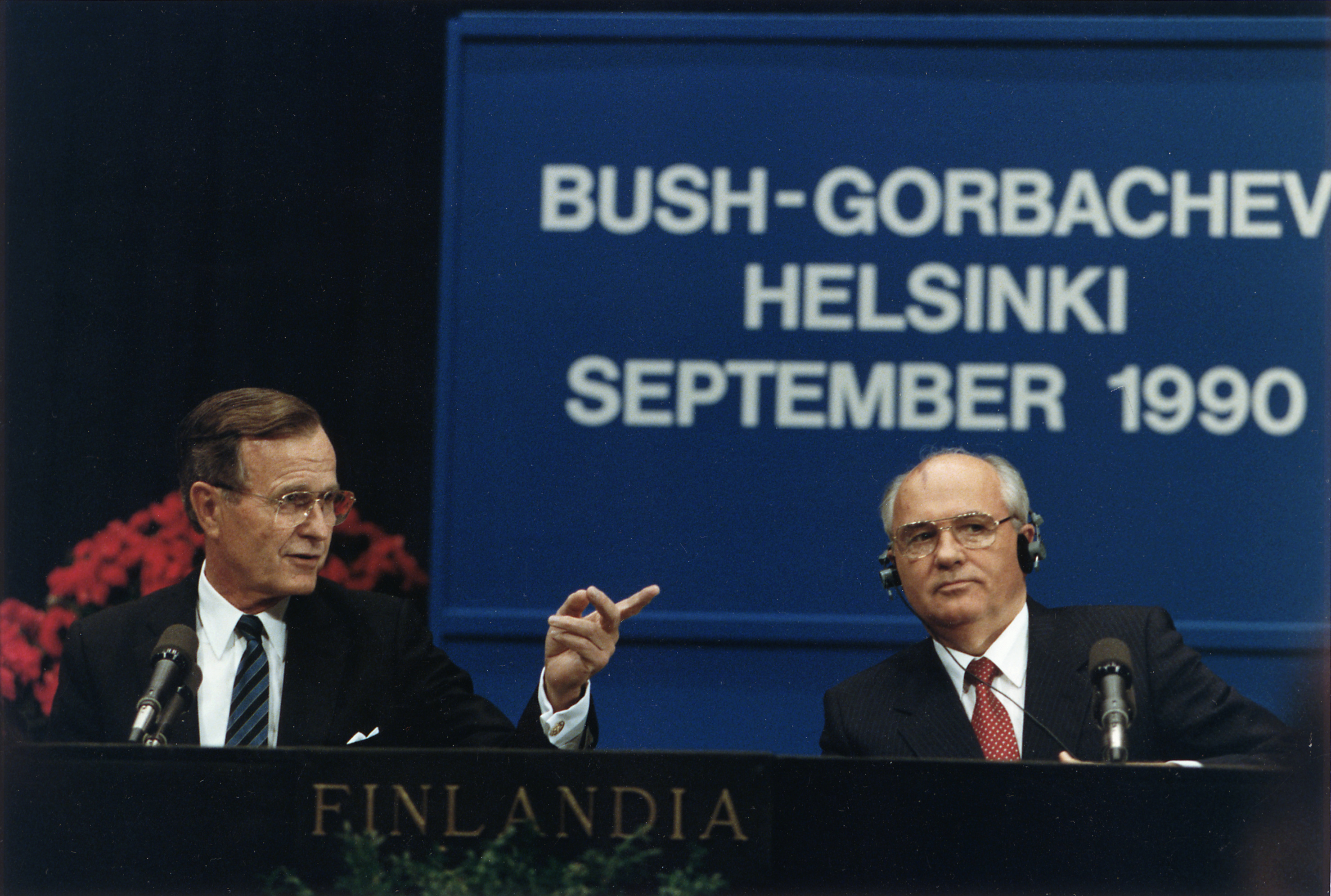
George H. W. Bush and Mikhail Gorbachev at the Helsinki summit in 1990

| Date | Place | Country | President of the United States | General Secretary or Premier of the Soviet Union | Notes |
|---|---|---|---|---|---|
| November 19–21, 1985 | Geneva | Switzerland | Ronald Reagan | Mikhail Gorbachev | Main article: Geneva Summit (1985) First international summit between American and Soviet heads of state since the end of détente. Failed to produce agreements due to the American refusal to abandon the Strategic Defense Initiative but ended in improved American-Soviet relations. |
| October 11–12, 1986 | Reykjavík | Iceland | Ronald Reagan | Mikhail Gorbachev | Main article: Reykjavík Summit Held at Höfði House. Nearly achieved agreement on bilateral nuclear disarmament but suddenly collapsed due to the American refusal to abolish the SDI. Nevertheless resulted in major diplomatic gains between the United States and the Soviet Union |
| December 8–10, 1987 | Washington, D.C. | United States | Ronald Reagan | Mikhail Gorbachev | Main article: Washington Summit (1987) Ended in the signing of the Intermediate-Range Nuclear Forces (INF) Treaty limiting short-range and intermediate-range ballistic missiles. Also included discussions on conventional and chemical weapons; human rights; and proxy conflicts in the Third World. |
| May 29 – June 3, 1988 | Moscow | Soviet Union | Ronald Reagan | Mikhail Gorbachev | Main article: Moscow Summit (1988) Held in the Kremlin Palace. Continued negotiations on topics from the Washington Summit and produced a joint statement on arms control. |
| December 7, 1988 | New York City | United States | Ronald Reagan | Mikhail Gorbachev | Main article: Governors Island Summit Held on Governors Island. Also in attendance President-elect George H. W. Bush. Gorbachev left the summit early due to the 1988 Spitak earthquake which struck the Armenian S.S.R. that same day. |
| December 2–3, 1989 | Valletta | Malta | George H. W. Bush | Mikhail Gorbachev | Main article: Malta Summit Conference convened several weeks after the Monday demonstrations and the fall of the Berlin Wall ending Marxist-Leninist rule in East Germany. Held aboard the Soviet cruise ship SS Maxim Gorkiy. Conference ended with a symbolic declaration that the Cold War had ended. |
| May 30 – June 3, 1990 | Washington, D.C. | United States | George H. W. Bush | Mikhail Gorbachev | Main article: Washington Summit (1990) Signing of the 1990 Chemical Weapons Accord. |
| September 9, 1990 | Helsinki | Finland | George H. W. Bush | Mikhail Gorbachev | Main article: Helsinki Summit (1990) Discussed the Iraqi invasion of Kuwait and German reunification. |
| November 19, 1990 | Paris | France | George H. W. Bush | Mikhail Gorbachev | Signing of the Treaty on Conventional Armed Forces in Europe. |
| July 17, 1991 | London | United Kingdom | George H. W. Bush | Mikhail Gorbachev | Held in conjunction with the 17th G7 Summit. |
| July 30–31, 1991 | Moscow | Soviet Union | George H. W. Bush | Mikhail Gorbachev | Signing of the Strategic Arms Reduction Treaty (START I). |
| October 29–30, 1991 | Madrid | Spain | George H. W. Bush | Mikhail Gorbachev | Held in conjunction with the Madrid Conference of 1991 at the Royal Palace of Madrid, which also included Israeli Prime Minister Yitzhak Shamir. Final meeting between American and Soviet heads of state due to the dissolution of the Soviet Union and the transfer of power to President Boris Yeltsin of the new Russian Federation in December 1991. |

== See also ==
- Arms control
- Cold War
- Détente
- Foreign policy of the United States
- Foreign relations of the Soviet Union
- Nuclear disarmament
- Soviet Union–United States relations
- List of Russia–United States summits
