= Helsinki Summit =

Helsinki Summit may refer to

- Helsinki Summit (1990), a meeting between US president George H. W. Bush and Soviet general secretary Mikhail Gorbachev
- The 2018 Russia–United States Summit, a meeting between US President Donald Trump and Russian President Vladimir Putin
