= Malta Summit =

1989 meeting between the heads of state of the US and Soviet Union

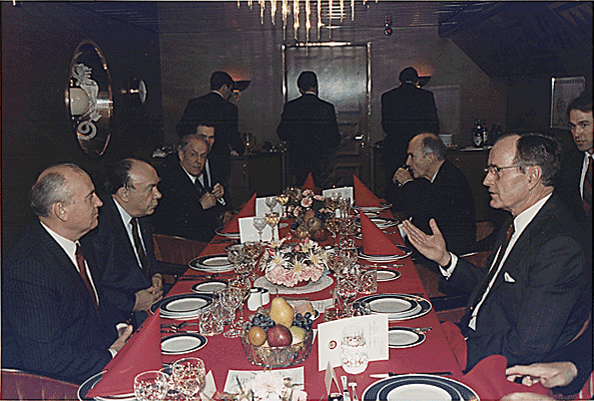
- Gorbachev and Bush about to share a meal on board the Soviet cruise ship Maksim Gorkiy
- Host country: Malta
- Date: December 2–3, 1989
- Cities: Birżebbuġa
- Venues: Maksim Gorkiy
- Participants: (Soviet Union) Mikhail Gorbachev; (United States) George H. W. Bush
- Follows: Governors Island Summit
- Precedes: Washington Summit (1990)

The Malta Summit was a meeting between United States president George H. W. Bush and Soviet General Secretary Mikhail Gorbachev on December 2–3, 1989, just a few weeks after the fall of the Berlin Wall. It followed a meeting that included Ronald Reagan in New York in December 1988. During the summit, Bush and Gorbachev declared an end to the Cold War, although whether it was truly such is a matter of debate. News reports of the time referred to the Malta Summit as one of the most important since World War II, when British prime minister Winston Churchill, Soviet General Secretary Joseph Stalin and US president Franklin D. Roosevelt agreed on a post-war plan for Europe at the Yalta Conference.

== Summit highlights ==
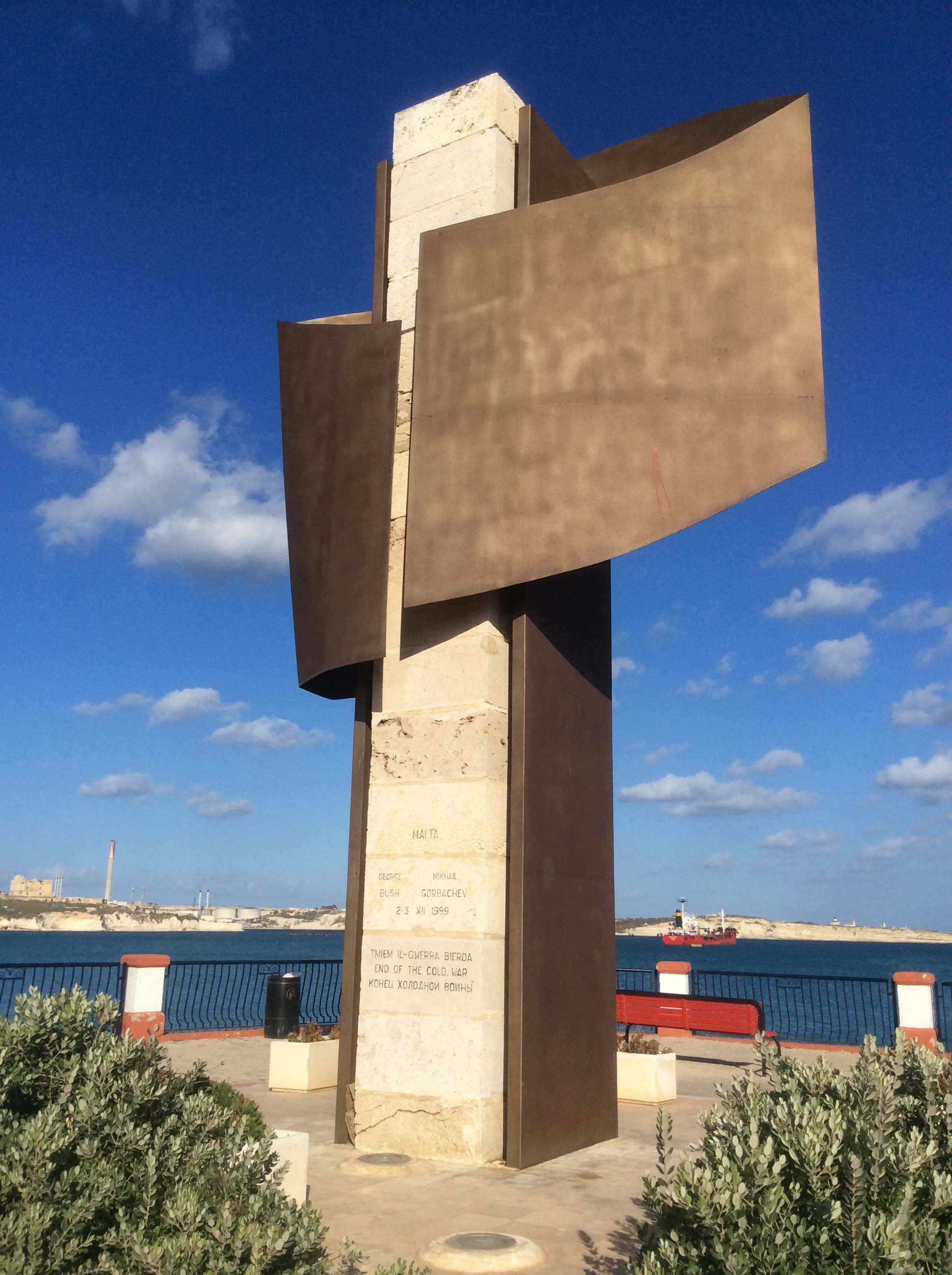
Monument in Birżebbuġa commemorating the Malta Summit

Brent Scowcroft and other members of the US administration were initially concerned that the proposed Malta Summit would be "premature" and that it would generate high expectations but result in little more than Soviet grandstanding. However, French president François Mitterrand, British prime minister Margaret Thatcher, other European leaders, and key members of the United States Congress prevailed upon President Bush to meet with Chairman Gorbachev.

No agreements were signed at the Malta Summit. Its main purpose was to provide the two superpowers, the United States and the Soviet Union, with an opportunity to discuss the rapid changes taking place in Europe with the lifting of the Iron Curtain, which had separated the Eastern Bloc from Western Europe for four decades. The summit is viewed by some observers as the official end of the Cold War. At a minimum, it marked the lessening of tensions that were the hallmark of that era and signaled a major turning point in East-West relations. During the summit, President Bush expressed his support for Gorbachev's perestroika initiative and other reforms in the Communist bloc.

At the summit, as a token, US president George Bush presented all participants of the conference with a piece of the Berlin Wall. It was gathered on a presidential mission in which two pilots and four soldiers with sledgehammers were sent to Berlin where 180 kilograms (400 lb) were collected; 90 kilograms (200 lb) were given to the president and 90 kilograms (200 lb) given to members of the 207th Aviation Company.

Speaking at a joint news conference, the Soviet leader announced:

The world is leaving one epoch and entering another. We are at the beginning of a long road to a lasting, peaceful era. The threat of force, mistrust, psychological and ideological struggle should all be things of the past.

I assured the President of the United States that I will never start a hot war against the USA.

In reply, President Bush said:

We can realise a lasting peace and transform the East-West relationship to one of enduring co-operation. That is the future that Chairman Gorbachev and I began right here in Malta.

== Other participants ==
Also present at the Malta Summit were:

Soviet delegation

- Marshal of the Soviet Union Sergei Akhromeyev, military affairs adviser to Gorbachev
- Alexander Bessmertnykh, Soviet Deputy Foreign Minister
- Anatoly Dobrynin, Soviet Ambassador to the United States from 1962 to 1986
- Eduard Shevardnadze, Soviet Foreign Minister
- Alexander Yakovlev, chief ideologist of the Communist Party of the Soviet Union (CPSU) and Chairman of the International Policy Commission of the CPSU Central Committee

U.S. delegation

- James Baker, U.S. Secretary of State
- Robert Blackwill, then Special Assistant to the President for National Security Affairs and Senior Director for European and Soviet Affairs at the National Security Council
- Jack F. Matlock, Jr., U.S. Ambassador to the Soviet Union
- Condoleezza Rice, then Director for Soviet and East European Affairs at the National Security Council
- Brent Scowcroft, U.S. National Security Adviser
- Raymond Seitz, U.S. Assistant Secretary of State for European and Canadian Affairs
- John H. Sununu, White House chief of staff
- Margaret D. Tutwiler, U.S. Assistant Secretary of State for Public Affairs and Spokeswoman of the Department
- Paul Wolfowitz, U.S. Under Secretary of Defense for Policy
- Robert Zoellick, Counselor of the Department of State

== Venue: "From Yalta to Malta", and back ==
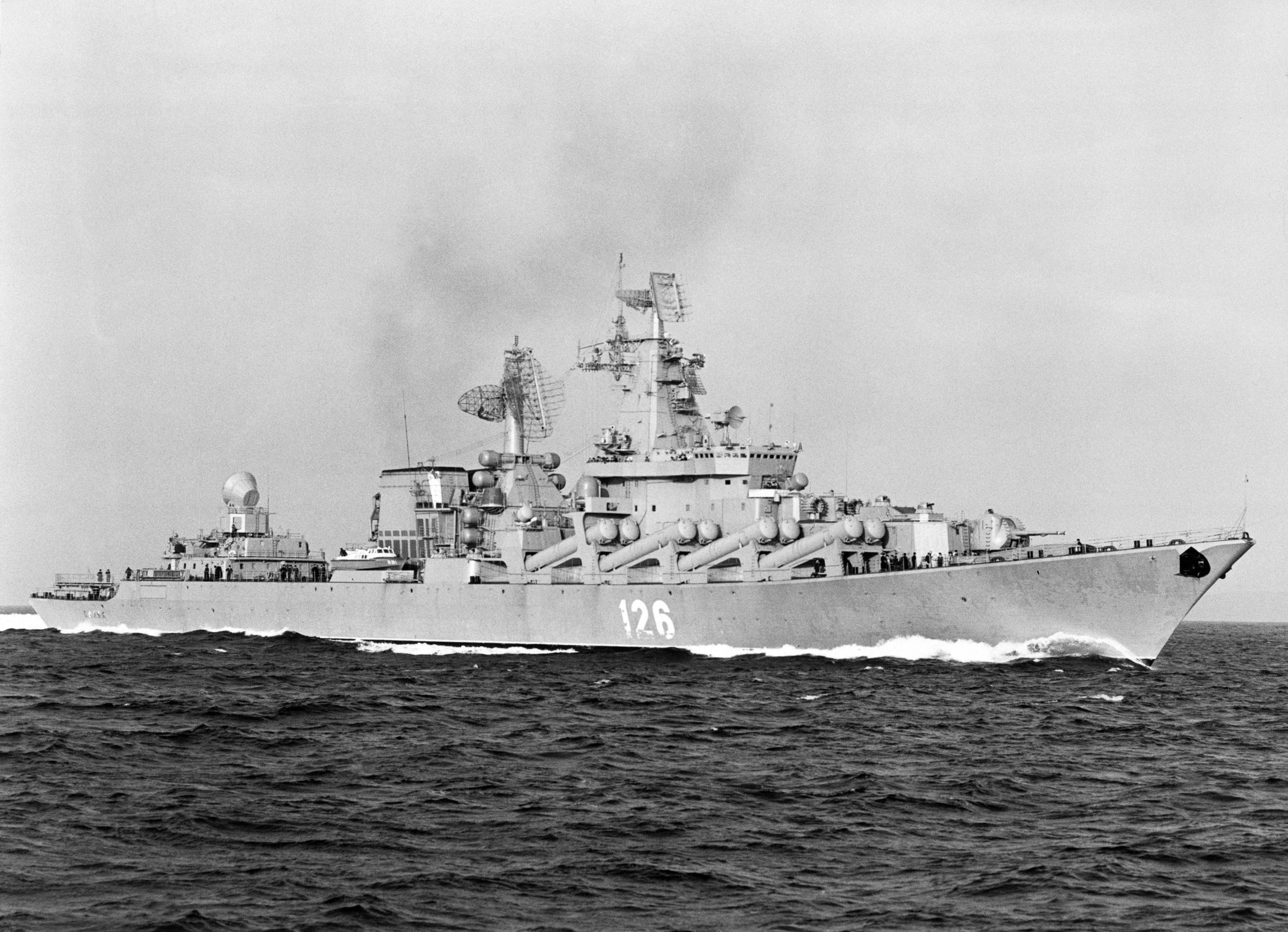
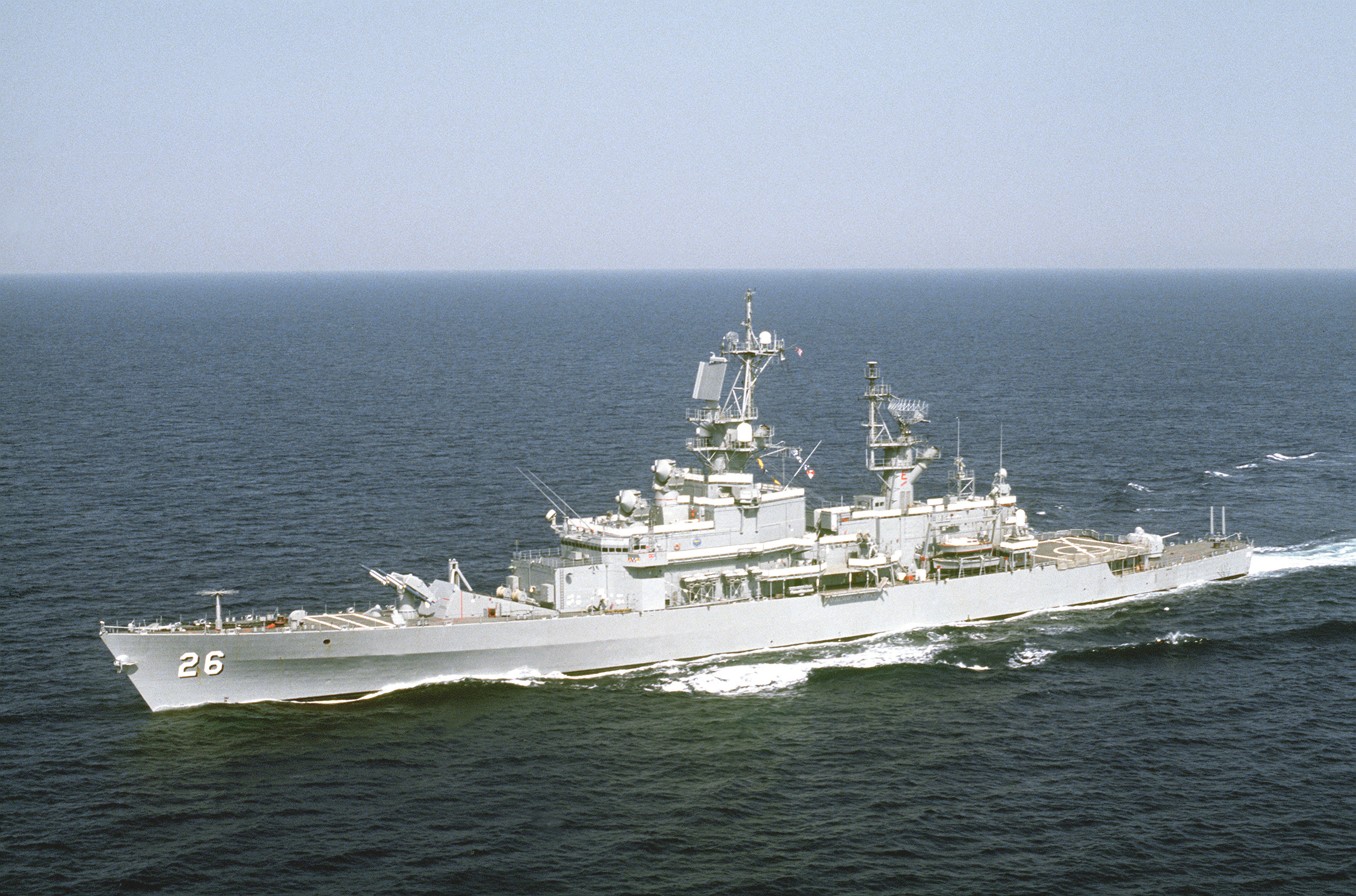
The Soviet cruiser Slava (top) and US cruiser Belknap (bottom) hosted the respective delegations

The meetings took place in the Mediterranean, off the island of Malta. The Soviet delegation used the missile cruiser Slava, while the US delegation had their sleeping quarters aboard USS Belknap. The ships were anchored in a roadstead off the coast of Marsaxlokk. Stormy weather and choppy seas resulted in some meetings being cancelled or rescheduled, and gave rise to the moniker the "Seasick Summit" among international media. The meetings ultimately took place aboard Maksim Gorkiy, a Soviet cruise ship chartered to West German tour company Phoenix Reisen, which anchored in the harbor at Marsaxlokk.

The idea of a summit in the open sea is said to have been inspired largely by President Bush's fascination with World War II president Franklin D. Roosevelt's habit of meeting foreign leaders on board naval vessels. The choice of Malta as a venue was the subject of considerable pre-summit haggling between the two superpowers. According to Condoleezza Rice:

... it took a long time to get it arranged, finding a place, a place that would not be ceremonial, a place where you didn't have to do a lot of other bilaterals. And fortunately—or unfortunately—they chose Malta, which turned out to be a really horrible place to be in December. Although the Maltese were wonderful, the weather was really bad.

The choice of venue was also highly symbolic. The Maltese Islands are strategically located at the geographic centre of the Mediterranean Sea, where east meets west and north meets south. Consequently, Malta has a long history of domination by foreign powers. It served as a British naval base during the 19th and early 20th centuries, and suffered massive destruction during World War II. Malta declared its neutrality between the two superpowers in 1980, following the closure of British military bases and the North Atlantic Treaty Organization Regional Headquarters (CINCAFMED), previously located on Malta. Neutrality is entrenched in the Constitution of Malta, which provides as follows, at section 1(3):

Malta is a neutral state actively pursuing peace, security and social progress among all nations by adhering to a policy of non-alignment and refusing to participate in any military alliance.

On February 2, 1945, as the War in Europe drew to a close, Malta was the venue for the Malta Conference, an equally significant meeting between US president Franklin D. Roosevelt and British prime minister Winston Churchill prior to their Yalta meeting with Joseph Stalin. The Malta Summit of 1989 signaled a reversal of many of the decisions taken at the 1945 Yalta Conference.

== See also ==
- Soviet Union–United States relations
- Malta–United States relations
- Cold War (1985–1991)
- Revolutions of 1989
- Soviet Union–United States summits
- Governors Island Summit
- Helsinki Summit (1990)
- New world order (politics)
