= Washington Summit (1990) =

International Cold War summit

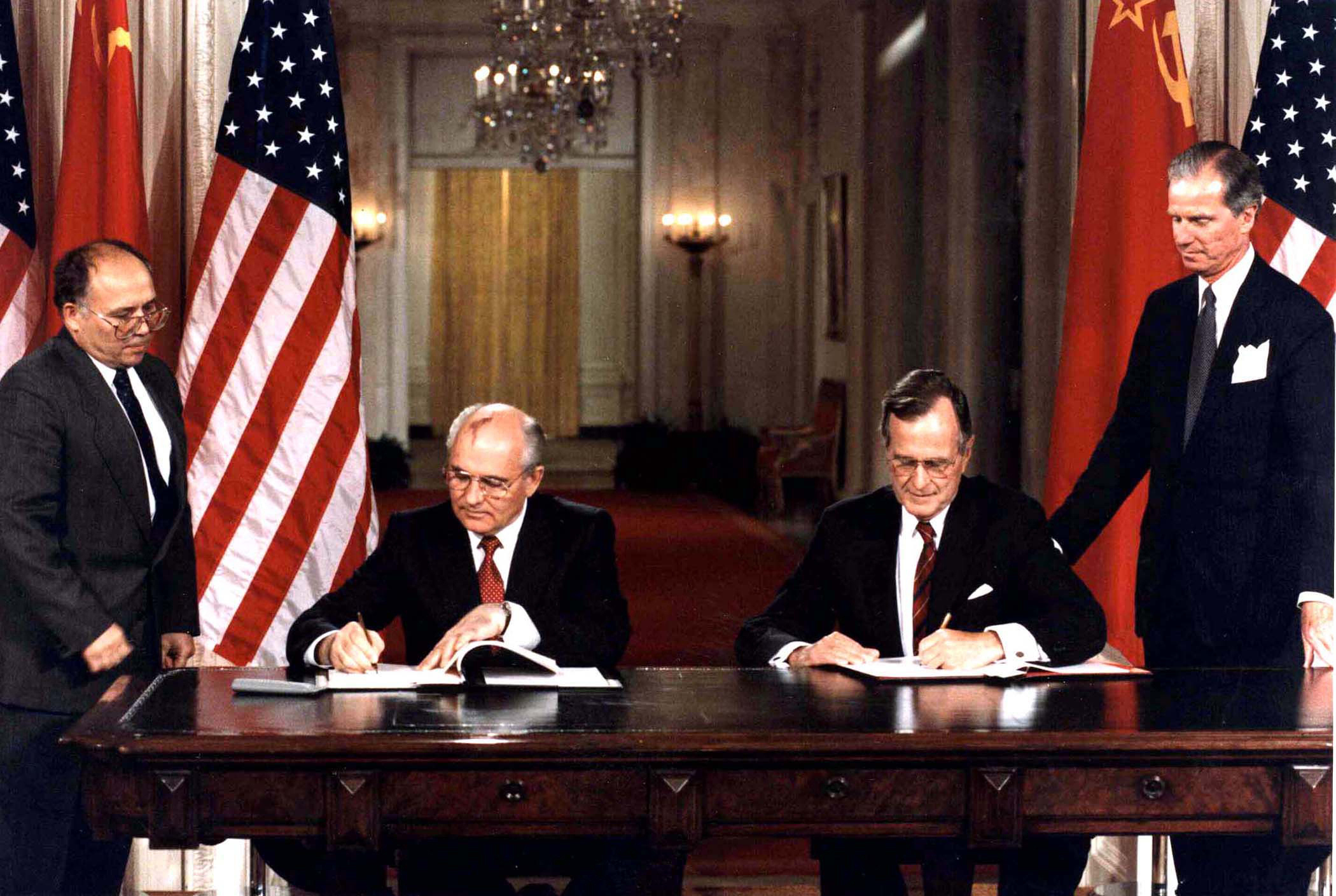
- Host country: United States
- Date: May 30–June 3, 1990
- Cities: Washington, D.C.
- Venues: White House, Camp David
- Participants: (Soviet Union) Mikhail Gorbachev (United States) George H. W. Bush
- Follows: Malta Summit
- Precedes: Helsinki Summit (1990)

The Washington Summit of 1990, also known as the "Two Plus Four" talks, was an international summit in the history of the Cold War in which the United States and Germany gained the Soviet Union's support for the reunification of Germany by agreeing that NATO needed to be reformed. As part of this effort, US President George H. W. Bush called for a NATO summit to reform the organization and demonstrate NATO's willingness to present a different approach to the Soviet Union. As part of his efforts to improve relations between the United States and the Soviet Union, Bush proposed a bilateral summit in Washington to Soviet Union President Mikhail Gorbachev, in addition to the NATO summit. Gorbachev agreed to the proposal, which resulted in the Washington Summit of 1990.

Overall, the Washington Summit increased Bush's familiarity with the Soviet Union's domestic struggles, resulted in an agreement on trade between the two countries, and included talks about the arms race. However, there were no breakthroughs in Germany or its reunification process. As a result, the Washington Summit gave the leaders of the United States and the Soviet Union the opportunity to debate a number of crucial topics and look for methods to enhance bilateral ties. Even though there were no significant breakthroughs, the summit improved intercultural understanding and opened the door for future communication and collaboration.

== Background ==
=== Timing of the Summit ===
The timing of the Washington Summit of 1990 was critical in exerting pressure on Gorbachev to make significant decisions regarding reunification and other critical issues. The summit was viewed as an opportunity for the United States to showcase its commitment to promote peace and stability in Europe. One of the key concerns at the summit was the reunification of Germany. Germany, in particular, was concerned about the potential for delays in the Two Plus Four talks, given that the national German election was scheduled to follow soon after. To address these concerns, the United States and its allies put pressure on Gorbachev to take concrete action and facilitate the reunification process. This pressure was an attempt to ensure that Gorbachev made decisions that would prevent the complete disintegration of East Germany.

=== Lithuania's nationalist movement ===
Lithuania’s independence movement was a crucial factor in shaping the preparations for the 1991 US-USSR Summit. Lithuania's push for sovereignty received significant public support from Europe and the United States, leading to pressure on the US government to take a more cautious approach towards the Soviet Union in negotiations. The United States, wary of appearing to support the Soviet Union at a sensitive time, was reluctant to offer large loans or extend most favored nation trading status to the Soviet Union. These developments had a profound impact on the summit's negotiations, particularly in the area of trade. The Soviet Union was keen to secure favorable trade deals with the United States, but the US was hesitant to offer concessions that could be perceived as undermining Lithuania's sovereignty. This led to a complex and difficult negotiation process that reflected the changing geopolitical landscape of the time.

=== The Helsinki principles ===
The Helsinki principles, which emphasize the importance of respecting the territorial integrity of states and promoting democratic values, played an essential role in shaping the Washington Summit of 1990. The summit was focused on promoting peace, stability, and cooperation in Europe, and the Helsinki principles provided a useful framework for achieving these goals. The summit included discussions on issues such as arms control, trade, and security, all of which were governed by the principles outlined in the Helsinki Final Act. The United States used the aforementioned Helsinki principles as a basis for their argument that Germany should be reunited in a peaceful and democratic manner.

=== Germany's role in NATO ===
Germany's role in NATO was a central concern for both the United States and the Soviet Union and greatly shaped the preparations of the summit. The United States strongly supported Germany's membership in NATO, while the Soviet Union held reservations because it viewed NATO as a threat to Soviet security. It was concerned that NATO's potential to expand eastward by including Germany would weaken the Warsaw Pact, the Soviet military alliance. In response, the United States offered the Soviet Union the following assurances to alleviate its concerns about German membership: “future limitation of the size of Bundeswehr, a prohibition against a united Germany developing nuclear weapons of its own, talks on tactical nuclear armaments, a transitional period of the Soviet troops to withdraw, changes to NATO, and a guarantee that the Soviet Union would be respected during the unification process."

== Conference ==
Gorbachev and his wife landed in Washington on May 30, 1990. Though his leadership was politically controversial in the Soviet Union, he received a generally positive reception from the American public. The three-day conference was broadcast and analyzed by media outlets from both sides, with Russian channels providing less coverage than they did during the previous two Washington Summits. Political opposition and an increasing push for German unification from the fall of the Berlin Wall a year prior, combined with the Lithuanian independence movements, resulted in both nations facing economic and political difficulties. Negotiations during the summit primarily focused on resolving these issues to maintain national stability.

Similar to the 1973 and 1987 Summits, the first day of the event began with organizational festivities, including a welcoming ceremony on the South Lawn of the White House and a state dinner during which both leaders pledged to support Europe for the better. Seeing the diminishing hostilities between the two nations and the benefits of positive relations, Bush preferred to cooperate with the USSR rather than to allow the downfall of the divided nation. The conference provided Gorbachev with opportunities to interact with influential people from a variety of fields and be awarded several honorary distinctions arranged by Bush. Through increasing Gorbachev's international popularity Bush was able to gain Gorbachev's favour, which helped convince him to allow German NATO membership.

Throughout the following days, both world leaders discussed strengthening policies of bilateral cooperation that had been established in previous summits as a means of resolving the pressing issues of the time. This included the expansion of economic trade, the reduction of weapons of mass destruction, the promotion of clean energy as well as the joint humanitarian aid initiatives to combat inequality, diseases and environmental degradation. Official agreements between the two nations were signed after the conference, including the 1991 START I agreement and the 1993 Chemical Weapons Convention which limited weapons of mass destruction between the two nations.

The previous year, Gorbachev had rejected the question of German unification and possible NATO membership raised by President Bush and West German Chancellor Kohl. This issue was reopened during the 1990 Washington Summit. Referencing the Helsinki Accords, Gorbachev publicly declared his support for German self-determination for the first time, to the consternation of his advisors. His support included an approval for a united Germany to seek NATO membership without Soviet interference.

Increasing trade relations between the US and Europe was another particularly pressing topic for Gorbachev that was discussed during the summit. Revolving around the idea of the Most Favored Nation (MFN) status, despite being warned by his advisors that the chances were low, Gorbachev hoped that increasing trade between the two superpowers would economically support the increasingly divided Eastern European bloc. A trade deal based around economic aid was set between the two continents, with the conditions of permitting emigration and the removal of sanctions from Eastern separatist nations to appease Congress.

On the last day of the conference and at the insistence of Bush, Gorbachev reaffirmed his statements on German reunification and NATO membership during a public joint statement. With the agreements set, the summit officially concluded on June 3.

== Historical significance ==
Although initial expectations for the Washington Summit did not foresee any major advancements, Gorbachev's confirmation of the Helsinki principle and diplomatic strategies influenced US-Soviet foreign policy and the structure of the post-Cold War international system. Gorbachev's statements confirming acceptance of German unification and NATO membership in the following week, June 1990, reflected a significant and rapid shift in Soviet position on the matter. After Germany joined NATO, the Warsaw Pact quickly lost its purpose and was dissolved in 1991.

Gorbachev, pressured to achieve favorable progress, pushed for a trade agreement that would grant Most Favored Nation (MFN) status. Bush, also influenced by pressure from Congress, agreed to sign grain and trade agreement under the condition that the agreement would not go to congress until Soviets lifted the embargo on Lithuania and passed emigration legislation. This satisfied Gorbachev, but given the secrecy of these stipulations, Bush faced public backlash and was accused of abandoning Lithuania by the press. In Moscow, the Washington Summit was mostly overlooked due to greater concerns over food insecurity and election and was perceived as a political campaigning from Gorbachev.

=== Impacts on NATO expansion and Russian foreign policy ===
Scholars have analyzed these events in the attempt to provide a better understanding over the issues and agreements regarding NATO's expansion to the East and Russian foreign policy today. There is still debate over whether Soviet Russia was deliberately misled during negotiations based on claims by Russians that they were given multiple assurances that NATO would not expand further to the East if a united Germany joined NATO. Scholars, such as Joshua Shifrinson, claim that even though American policymaking in the 1990s publicly promoted cooperation and informally appeased Soviet security concerns over possible expansion of NATO, evidence indicates an underlying attempt to shape an "American dominated post-Cold War system". On the other hand, Western officials, supported by scholars such as Mark Kramer and Kristina Spohr, claim the US made no commitment or "legally binding" binding agreement about the future additions to NATO.

Despite discussions and informal agreements made between Gorbachev and US Secretary of State James A. Baker and West German Chancellor Kohl in February 1990 regarding NATO expansion, Soviets failed to obtain any written agreements against NATO expansion to the East during the Washington Summit. The accords signed in September 1990 were consistent with what was discussed in the Washington Summit earlier in the year, thus there was no "formal prohibition" of NATO expansion. According to post-Cold War historian Mary Elise Sarotte, Gorbachev's actions towards German unification were taken based on discussions with Kohl in February and vague NATO non-extension assurances, contributing to Russian resentment towards the US and the Soviet leaders involved at the time over NATO expansion. Gorbachev's inability to secure a formal deal to prevent NATO expansion was a significant strategic failure, according to Vladimir Putin and Dmitri Medvedev. On the other hand, without compromising American interests, Bush successfully established a framework for German unification. Understanding this controversy provides insight to critical issues of international relations and how diplomacy functions, specifically the value of assurances, promises and commitments made between leaders and nations.

Diplomacy during the end of the Cold War in the form of "summitry" showed how historical change and peaceful transformation of the international system could be driven by systemic pressures and agency of key state leaders. The long-term repercussions of the Washington Summit, from the signed accords to informal negotiations, reflect diplomatic strategy successes and failures during the Cold War.

== Legacy ==
The Washington Summit in 1990 achieved progress towards the ultimate goal of a free and united Europe, including a free and united Germany. Through this process, they sought to affirm the will of the German people to reunite while also giving platform to the external repercussions of unification. Both the US and USSR stressed the need to build a new Europe based on peace and stability in which nuclear and conventional forces could be balanced and regional conflicts could be solved through cooperation. The reunification of Germany was celebrated in Berlin on October 3, 1990, with the Federal Republic of Germany officially signing its membership with NATO.

At the summit Secretary of State James Baker informed Soviet leaders that NATO did not have the goal of attacking the Soviet Union, although the Soviet Union viewed Germany joining NATO as a potential political and military threat. In the aftermath of the Washington Summit and the reunification of Germany, a NATO summit was held that would spell out the a new political role and adjust NATO's military strategy and structure in guaranteeing the peace of the new Europe.

After emphasizing their common desire to find joint ground for the regulation of nuclear weapons, several agreements between the United States and the Soviet Union were ultimately reached. During the meeting, US President Ronald Reagan and Soviet leader Mikhail Gorbachev signed a joint declaration committing to continued negotiations on nuclear and space weapons. As a consequence of that agreement, all of the major points in the Strategic Arms Reduction Treaty (START) had been settled by June 12, 1990, and the treaty was signed by Gorbachev and Bush on July 21. The treaty would be ratified by the US Senate in October 1992. Its goal was to prioritize reducing incentives for a nuclear first strike to increase strategic stability and predictability. Both nations shared a common goal of reducing the number of strategic warheads, especially those on heavy missiles and intercontinental ballistic missiles.

The Strategic Arms Reduction Treaty focused on eradicating 80 percent of all strategic nuclear weapons. As a result of the agreement, the number of Minutman Launch Facilities was reduced from 950 to 450. In South Dakota, all Minuteman II Launch Facilities and Launch Control Facilities were deactivated except two, Launch Facility (Missile Silo) Delta-09 and Launch Control Facility (LCF) Delta-01. These were preserved for their historical significance. The United States reduced its nuclear arsenal to around 8,556 warheads and the Soviet Union reduced its arsenal to about 6,449 weapons. The total number of intercontinental ballistic missiles launch facilities and nuclear warheads were all capped, as were the launchers and warheads of submarine-launched ballistic missiles. However, the "plan for peace" that was developed was met with some dissatisfaction in the United States Air Force when, for example, the Pentagon decided to deactivate the entire Minuteman II force in some states rather than update the existing Minuteman II infrastructure to Minuteman III technologies.

On June 1, 1990, presidents Bush and Gorbachev signed the bilateral U.S.–Soviet Chemical Weapons Accord; officially known as the "Agreement on Destruction and Non-production of Chemical Weapons and on Measures to Facilitate the Multilateral Convention on Banning Chemical Weapons". This agreement stated that the best long-term solution to the threat to international security that comes from the use and spread of chemical weapons is a multilateral, effectively verifiable chemical weapons convention that bans the development, production, and use of chemical weapons and gets rid of all stocks around the world and that non-proliferation measures are seen as a step towards getting such a convention.

Another major legacy of the Washington Summit was an emphasis on the need for US-Soviet Cooperation in helping to solve regional conflict worldwide to prevent violent and deadly local warfare. Cuba's support for the El Salvadorian guerillas and the Soviet Union's aid for Cuba both continued to be causes of concern for the United States. These disputes and concerns were settled in efforts to restore trust between the two countries. Within this same framework, the United States and the Soviet Union issued a joint statement on Ethiopia on June 2, 1990. Both countries supported a global meeting of heads of state convened by the United Nations to put an end to hostilities in the Horn of Africa.

The shared commitment to cooperation and trust expressed by the United States and the Soviet Union led to the establishment of economic relations. At the summit, the leaders signed a bilateral trade agreement, and the Soviet Union agreed to a new Long-Term Grain Agreement.

Overall, cooperation through communication and treaties between the US and USSR established at the Washington Summits created long-lasting agreements that favoured a new European architecture with a unified Germany and influenced a NATO summit. The cooperation also led to the building of new economic relations and arms control including the signing of START and the US-Soviet Chemical Weapons Accord.
