= Malta Conference (1945) =

Allied Powers' meeting to plan the final campaign against Germany

Malta Conference ARGONAUT CRICKET
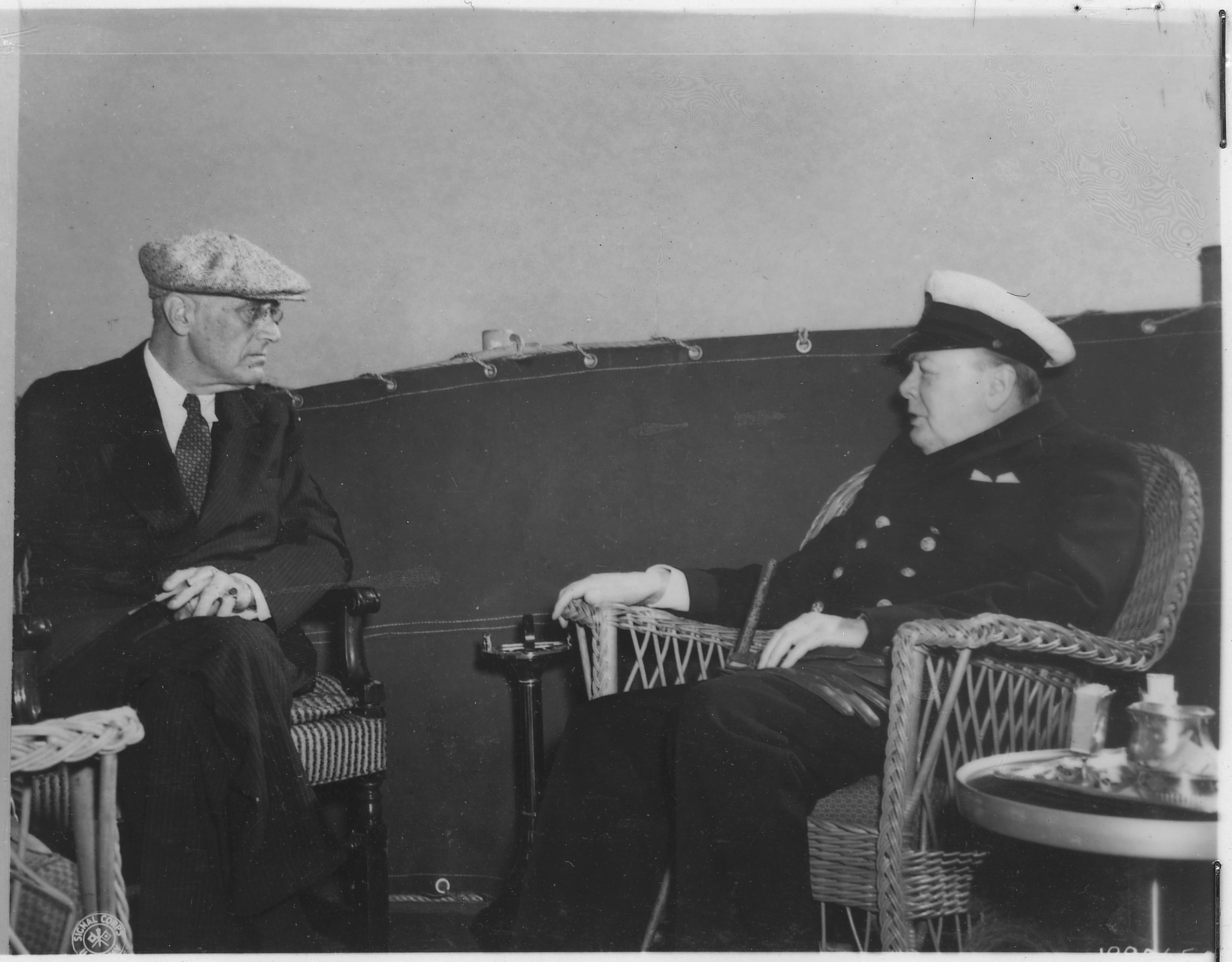
- Franklin D. Roosevelt and Winston Churchill at the Malta Conference
- Host country: Malta
- Date: January 30 – February 3, 1945
- Cities: Floriana, Malta
- Venues: Montgomery House
- Participants: United Kingdom; United States
- Precedes: Yalta Conference

The Malta Conference was held from January 30 to February 3, 1945, between President Franklin D. Roosevelt of the United States and Prime Minister Winston Churchill of the United Kingdom on the island of Malta. The purpose of the conference was to plan the final campaign against the Germans with the Combined Chiefs of Staff (the United States Joint Chiefs of Staff and the British Chiefs of Staff Committee). Politically, the overriding purpose was to present a united front against Stalin in the Yalta Conference a few days later. That did not happen once Yalta began, much to Churchill's disappointment. Both leaders agreed on the undesirability of the Red Army advancing into central Europe.

The Conference was given the code names of ARGONAUT and CRICKET, as well as several others.

The Malta Conference began on January 30, 1945, but Roosevelt did not arrive until February 2, the last day of the conference.

== Participants ==
Among the participants of the Conference were U.S. secretary of state Edward Stettinius, U.S. Ambassador to the Soviet Union W. Averell Harriman, Harry Hopkins, General of the Army George C. Marshall, Fleet Admiral Ernest J. King, Fleet Admiral Leahy, Prime Minister Winston Churchill, British Foreign Secretary Anthony Eden, Major General Laurence S. Kuter (representing General of the Army H.H. Arnold who was unable to attend due to illness), Field Marshal H. Maitland Wilson, Field Marshal Sir Alan Brooke, Air Chief Marshal Sir Charles F.A. Portal, Admiral of the Fleet Sir A.B. Cunningham, General Sir Hastings L. Ismay and Lieutenant General Jacob Devers.

== January 30, 1945 ==
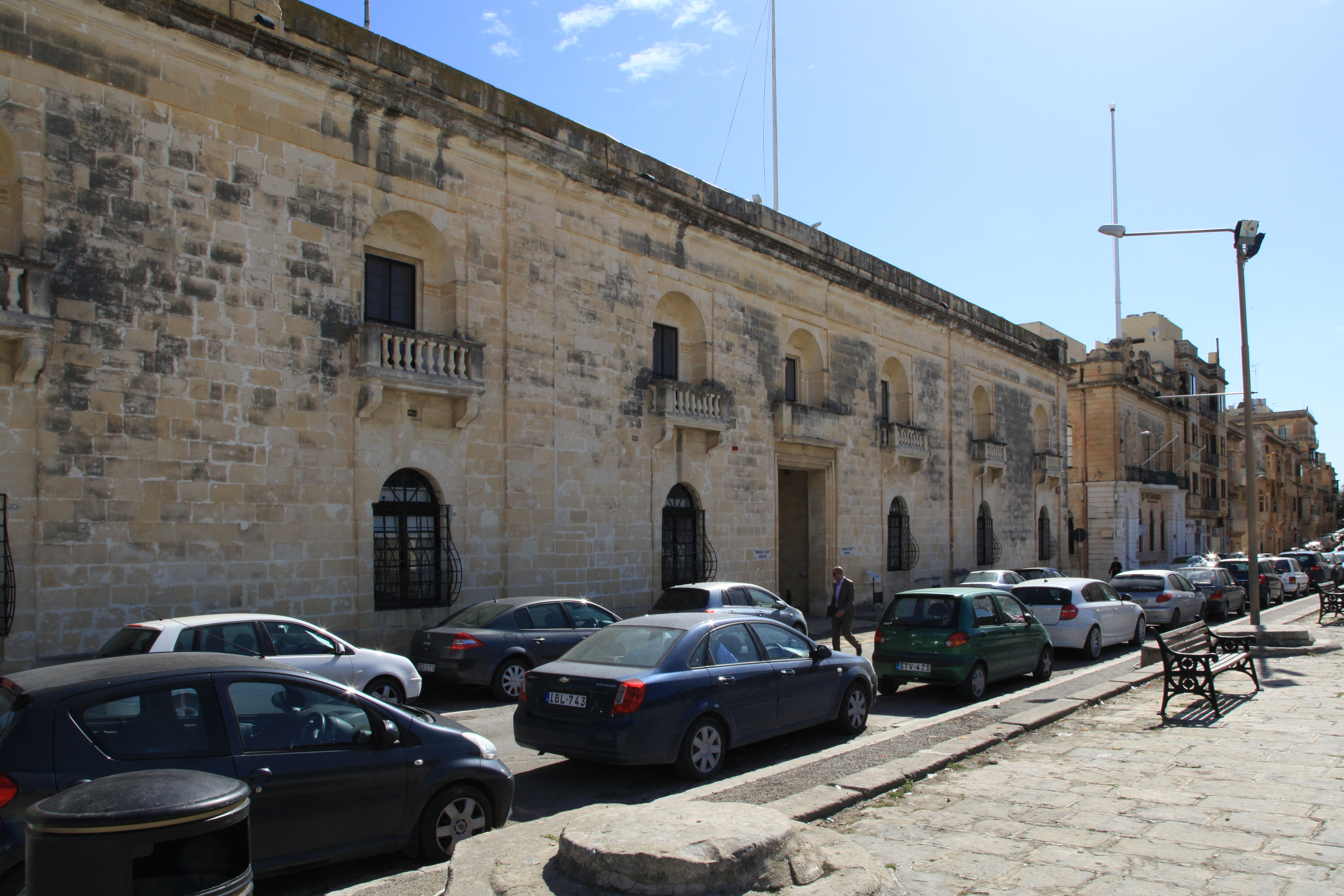
The conference was held at Montgomery House in Floriana

On Tuesday, January 30, 1945, at 10 a.m., the Joint Chiefs of Staff met in Montgomery House, Malta. Present were General of the Army Marshall, Fleet Admiral King, Major General Kuter, Lieutenant General Somervell, Lieutenant General Smith, Rear Admiral Duncan, Rear Admiral McCormick, Major General Bull, Major General Hull, Major General Wood, Major General Anderson, Brigadier General Loutzenheiser, Brigadier General Lindsay, Captain McDill, Colonel Peck, Colonel Dean, Colonel Lincoln.

The minutes show they worked on the agenda for the next American-British Staff Conference, an overall review of cargo shipping and strategy in Northwestern Europe.

== See also ==
- List of Allied World War II conferences
- Malta Summit, between George H. W. Bush and Mikhail Gorbachev
