= Governors Island Summit =

1988 conference

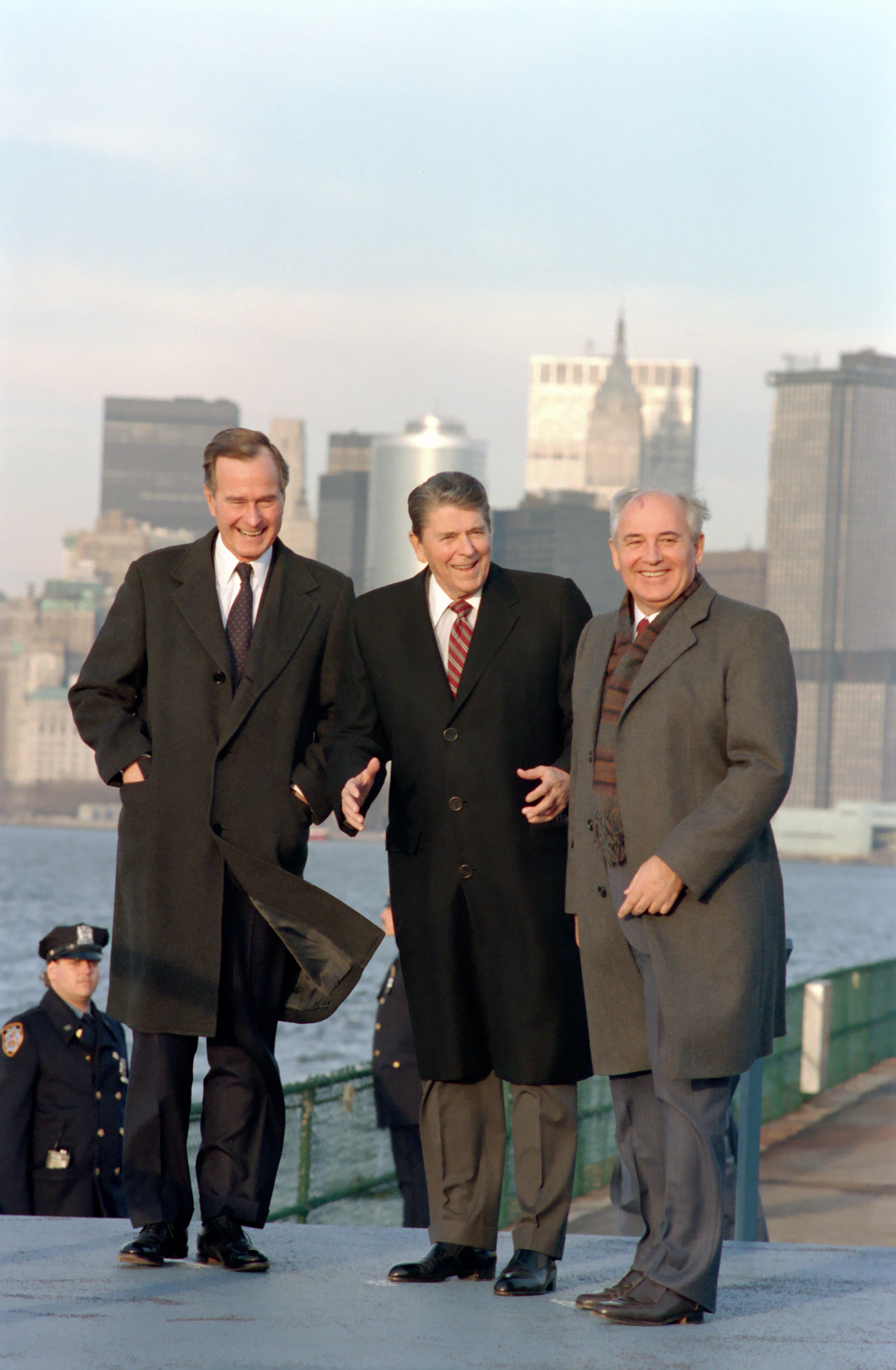
- Bush, Reagan and Gorbachev
- Host country: United States
- Date: December 7, 1988
- Cities: New York City
- Venues: Governors Island
- Participants: (Soviet Union) Mikhail Gorbachev (United States) Ronald Reagan
- Follows: Moscow Summit (1988)
- Precedes: Malta Summit

The Governors Island Summit was a summit meeting between U.S. President Ronald Reagan and General Secretary of the Communist Party of the Soviet Union Mikhail Gorbachev. It was held on December 7, 1988. U.S. Vice President and President-elect George H. W. Bush was also in attendance.

Gorbachev cut his trip to the United States short as soon as he was informed of the earthquake that had struck the Soviet republic of Armenia earlier that day.

== See also ==
- List of Soviet Union–United States summits (1943 to 1991)
