= Moscow Summit (1988) =

1988 Summit Between the USSR & USA

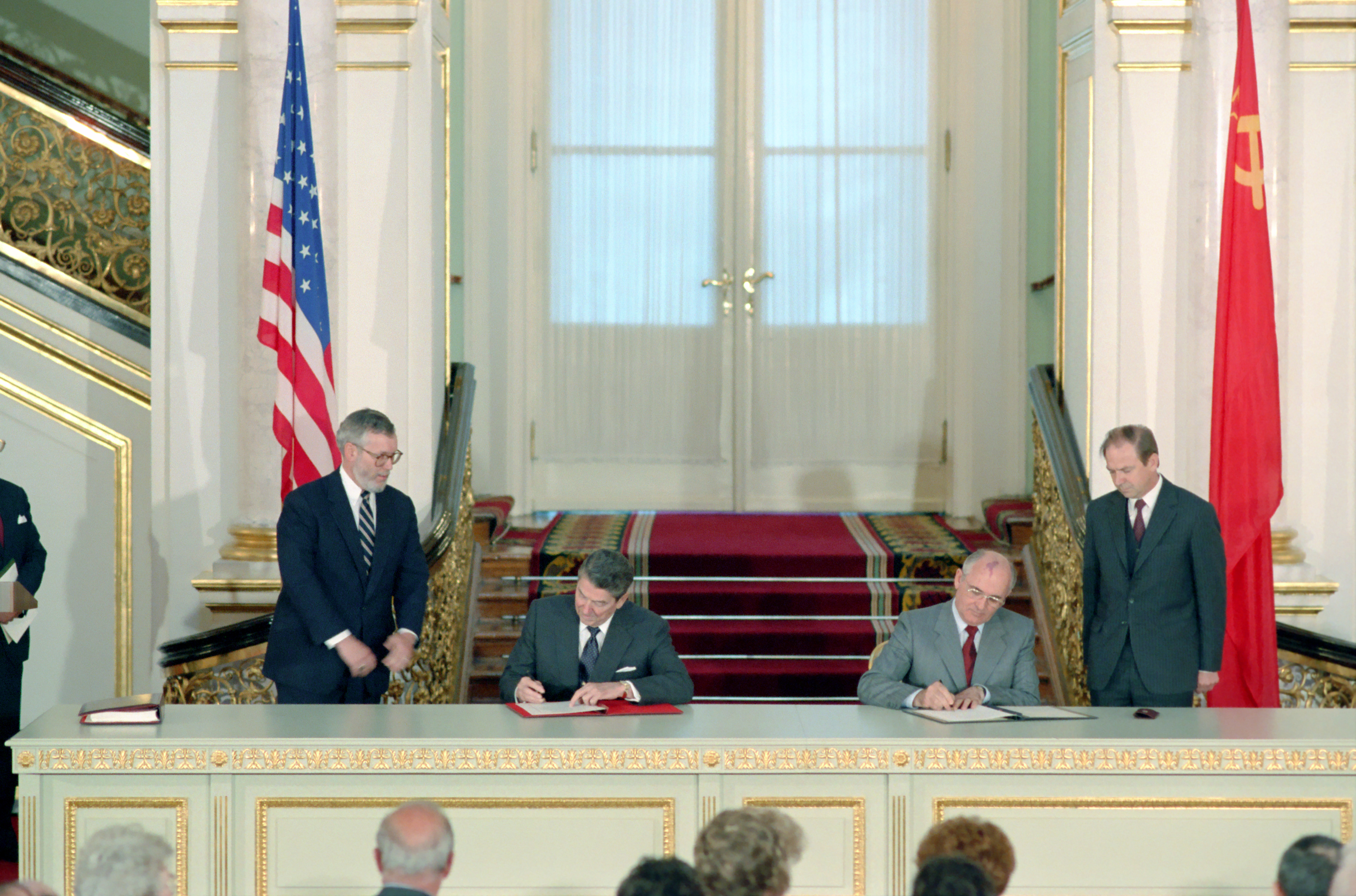
- Reagan and Gorbachev ratifying the INF Treaty in the Kremlin Palace
- Host country: Soviet Union
- Date: May 29 – June 2, 1988
- Cities: Moscow
- Venues: Kremlin Palace
- Participants: (Soviet Union) Mikhail Gorbachev (United States) Ronald Reagan
- Follows: Washington Summit
- Precedes: Governors Island Summit

The Moscow Summit was a summit meeting between U.S. President Ronald Reagan and General Secretary of the Communist Party of the Soviet Union Mikhail Gorbachev. It was held on May 29 – June 2, 1988. Reagan and Gorbachev finalized the Intermediate-Range Nuclear Forces Treaty (INF) after the U.S. Senate's ratification of the treaty in May 1988. Reagan and Gorbachev continued to discuss bilateral issues like Central America, Southern Africa, the Middle East and the pending withdrawal of Soviet troops from Afghanistan. Reagan and Gorbachev continued their discussions on human rights. The parties signed seven agreements on lesser issues such as student exchanges and fishing rights. A significant result was the updating of Soviet history books, which necessitated cancelling some history classes in Soviet secondary schools. In the end, Reagan expressed satisfaction with the summit.

President Reagan's Trip to USSR, Walking in Red Square with Mikhail Gorbachev, Moscow, May 31, 1988

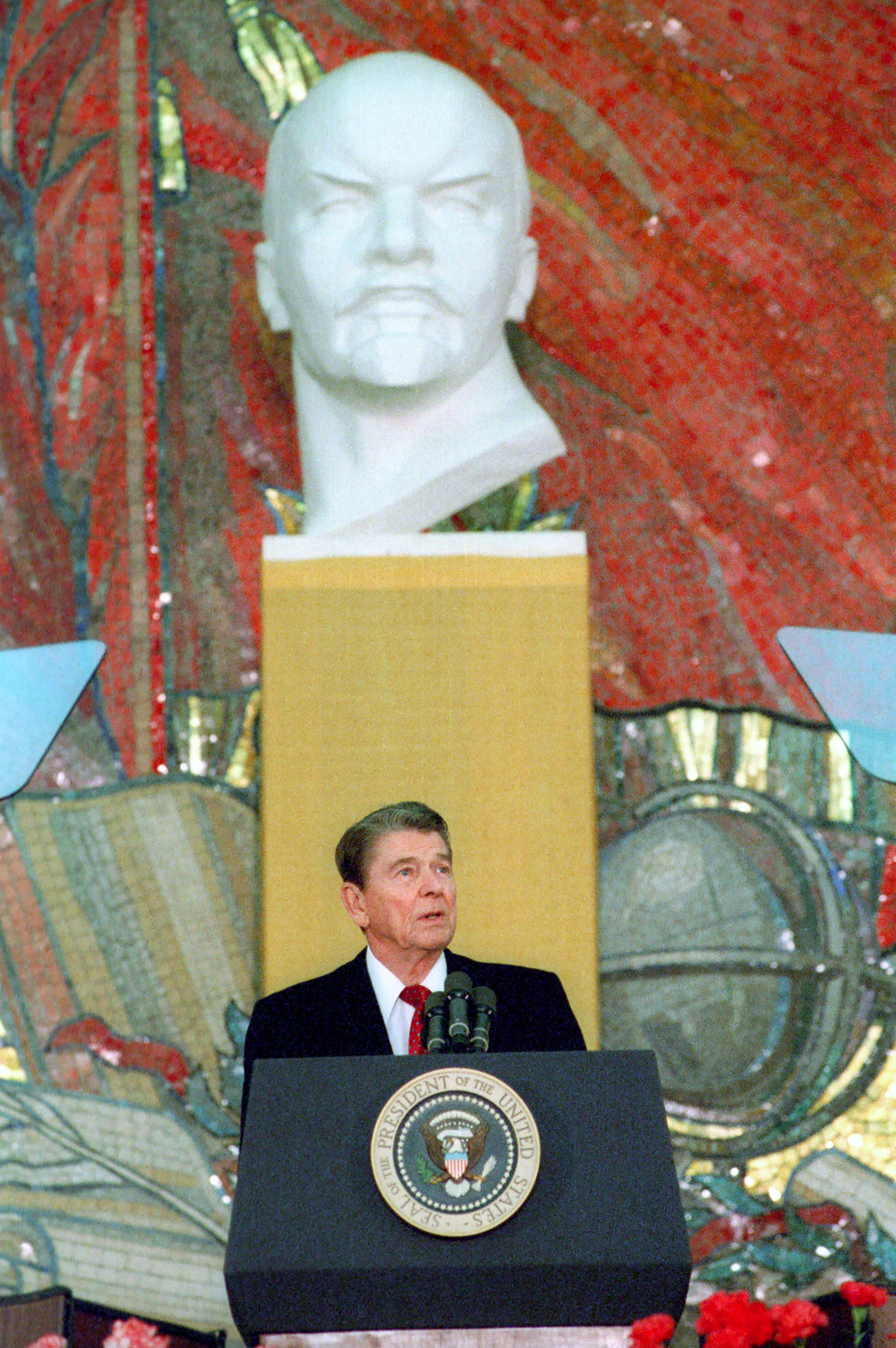
President Ronald Reagan giving a speech at Moscow State University in the USSR, 1988

Reagan and Gorbachev eventually issued a joint statement, of which excerpts are shown here:

The President and the General Secretary view the Moscow summit as an important step in the process of putting U.S.-Soviet relations on a more productive and sustainable basis.

One ironic instance of the summit was when Reagan gave Gorbachev a copy of the movie Friendly Persuasion, whose screenwriter Michael Wilson got blacklisted in the 1950s due to suspected communist sympathies.

Reagan travelled back to the United States via London to hold talks with Margaret Thatcher where he praised her role in East-West relations during a speech at the London Guildhall on June 3rd.

== See also ==
- List of Soviet Union–United States summits (1943 to 1991)
