= Gennadi Zakharov =

Soviet physicist

Gennadi Fyodorovich Zakharov (born c. 1947) was a Soviet physicist who worked for the United Nations who was arrested in a sting operation by the Federal Bureau of Investigation (FBI) in 1986.

In 1986, a Guyanese student named Leakh Bhoge, known to the world only as "C.S.", met him at a subway station in the Queens borough of New York City. C.S. had known Zakharov for about three years. He had been helped by Zakharov in his studies and in securing a job with a defense subcontractor.

During their encounter in the subway station, C.S. handed over an envelope that contained classified documents describing United States Air Force jet engines in exchange for $1,000 in cash. Immediately after the exchange, agents of the FBI swarmed around Zakharov, subduing him and shackling him in handcuffs. It was only then that Zakharov discovered that C.S. was working undercover with the FBI and that his plan to steal secret technical information from the United States had failed.

The KGB retaliated to this incident by arresting Nicholas Daniloff, an American journalist, three days later in Moscow charging him with espionage. After a hectic discussion between the two governments, the two men were exchanged without pressing any charges.
