= Nicholas Daniloff =

American journalist (1934–2024)

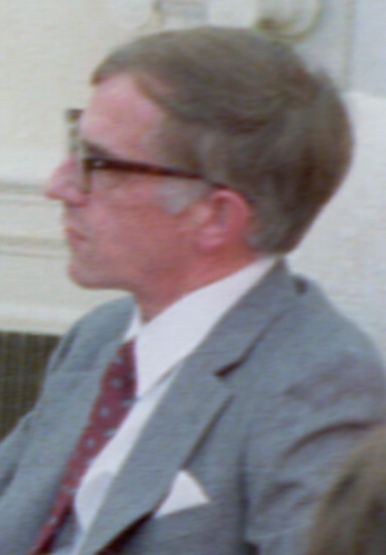
- Daniloff in 1986
- Born: December 30, 1934; Paris, France
- Died: October 17, 2024 (aged 89); Cambridge, Massachusetts, U.S.
- Education: Harvard University
- Spouse: Ruth Dunn (m. 1961; died 2024)
- Children: 2

Detainment
- Country: Soviet Union
- Detained: September 2, 1986
- Accusation: Espionage
- Charge: None
- Released: September 23, 1986
- Time held: 15 days

Nicholas S. Daniloff (December 30, 1934 – October 17, 2024) was an American journalist known for his reporting on the Soviet Union. In 1986, he was briefly detained by Soviet security services on espionage charges, sparking a diplomatic crisis.

== Background ==
Daniloff was born in Paris, the son of an American mother and a Russian father. His grandfather, general Yuri Danilov, was a chief of operations of Russian Imperial Army general-headquarters during World War I. He grew up in the United States, France, and Argentina, before moving to the United States to attend Harvard University. He worked for United Press International in the United Kingdom, Switzerland, and the Soviet Union, from 1959 to 1980, when he joined U.S. News & World Report.

== Detention and diplomatic crisis ==
Being a Moscow correspondent for a U.S. News & World Report, Daniloff came to wider international attention on September 2, 1986, after he was arrested in Moscow by the KGB and accused of espionage. On September 7, 1986, Daniloff was notified of a charge and had a proceeding scheduled for 2 pm at Lefortovo Prison in Moscow. No other information was known at the time about what happened during the proceedings.

The Reagan administration took the position that the Soviets had arrested Daniloff without cause, in retaliation for the arrest three days earlier of Gennadi Zakharov, an employee of the Soviet UN Mission. The Soviets initially contended that Daniloff had confidential government documents on him when he was arrested.

After intense discussion between the governments, on September 23 Daniloff was allowed to leave the Soviet Union without charges, Zakharov was allowed to leave the U.S. after pleading nolo contendere, and Soviet dissident Yuri Orlov was released to the West.

However, the diplomatic crisis did not end there. Expulsions of diplomats and suspected spies escalated to the point that by the end of October 1986, 100 Soviets, including a further 80 suspected Soviet intelligence agents, were expelled by the U.S. The Soviets expelled ten U.S. diplomats and withdrew all 260 of the Russian support staff working for the U.S. embassy in Moscow.

== Later life ==
Daniloff later contended in his autobiography, Two Lives, One Russia, that he had never held classified documents, and that the KGB had created false information. Daniloff became an instructor at Northeastern University's School of Journalism, and in 1992 he was named director of the school. He was also one of the co-authors of the book The Oath, a biography of Khassan Baiev. Daniloff published another memoir in 2008.

== Personal life and death ==
Daniloff was married to Ruth Dunn from 1961 until her death in January 2024; they had two children. Daniloff died nine months later, at a care home in Cambridge, Massachusetts, on October 17, 2024. He was 89.

== See also ==
- Paul Whelan
- Evan Gershkovich
