= Washington Summit (1987) =

Diplomatic conference

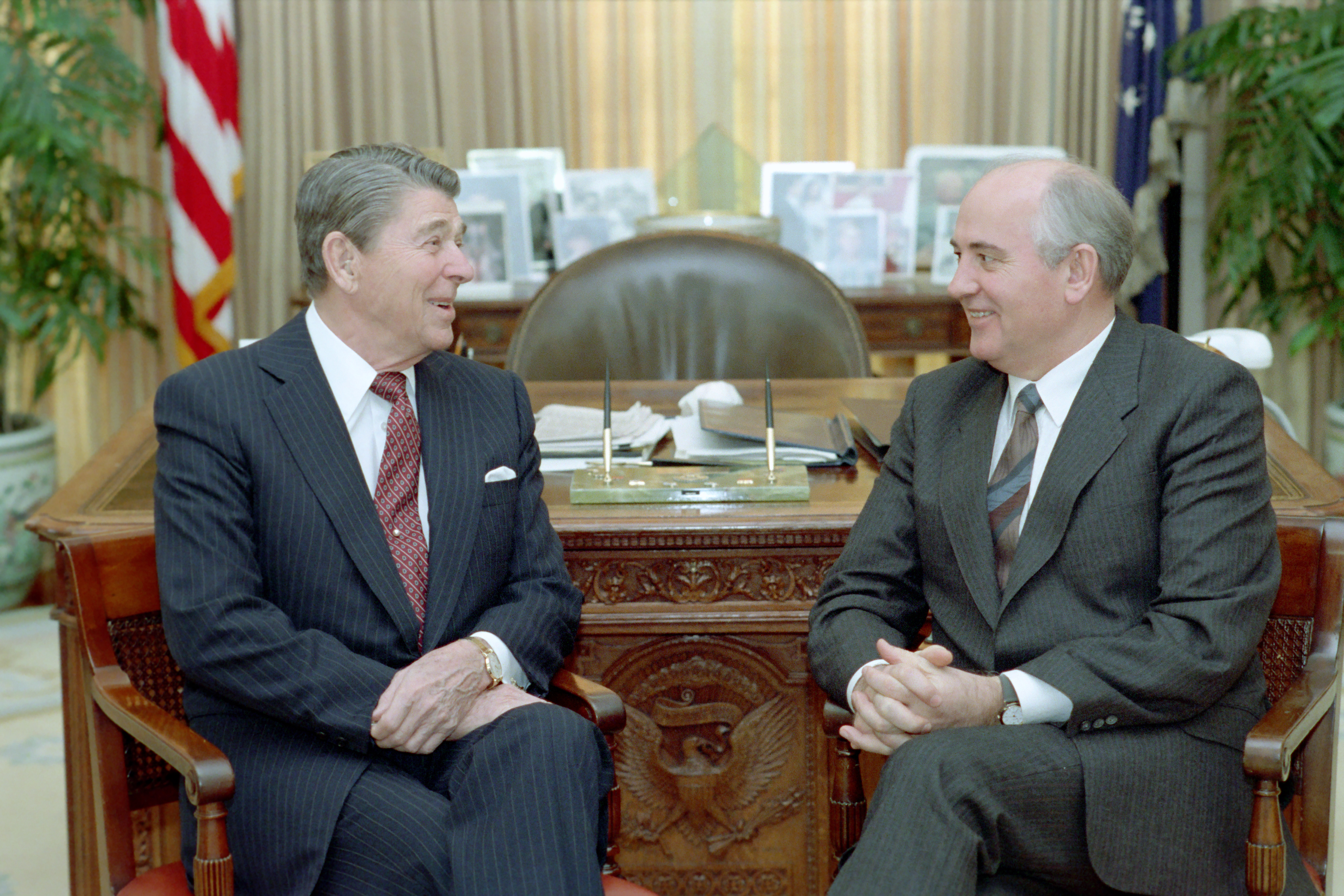
- Reagan and Gorbachev in the White House
- Host country: United States
- Date: December 8–10, 1987
- Cities: Washington, D.C.
- Venues: White House
- Participants: (Soviet Union) Mikhail Gorbachev (United States) Ronald Reagan
- Follows: Reykjavík Summit
- Precedes: Moscow Summit (1988)

The Washington Summit of 1987 was a Cold War-era meeting between United States president Ronald Reagan and General Secretary of the Communist Party of the Soviet Union Mikhail Gorbachev that took place on December 8–10. Reagan and Gorbachev discussed regional conflicts in Afghanistan, Central America, and Southern Africa, arms control issues for chemical weapons as well as conventional weapons, the status of START negotiations, and human rights. A notable accomplishment of the Washington Summit was the signing of the Intermediate-Range Nuclear Forces (INF) Treaty.

== Background ==
Following the near-breakthrough of the previous year's Reykjavik Summit, and much to the chagrin of many supporters of both leaders, Reagan and Gorbachev began putting resources into INF Treaty negotiations. This, in addition to various troubles foreign and domestic in both countries led to a tense time preceding the Washington Summit.

For Reagan, trouble with the stock market, failure to win approval for Supreme-Court-nominee Robert Bork, and the Iran-Contra scandal were all generating political pressure. Also, criticism from an uncharacteristically large number of notable conservatives including former President Richard Nixon, former Secretary of State Henry Kissinger, commentator William Buckley, as well as members of his own administration resulted in a contentious political atmosphere around the INF Treaty.

Gorbachev too was encountering opposition, not only the INF treaty negotiations, but also his Perestroika reform programs. Despite replacing over 150 senior defense ministers and officers after the Mathias Rust incident, Gorbachev's frustrations were only compounded when just two months before the Washington Summit was held, then-candidate member of the Politburo and supporter of Gorbachev, Boris Yeltsin, denounced the Soviet General Secretary and resigned from his post in an unprecedented and highly controversial move. Though, according to Reagan's Secretary of State George P. Shultz, the Soviet leader was unusually contentious during their late-October meeting in Moscow to finalize the terms of the INF treaty, "Shultz had barely unpacked his bags back in Washington before word came from Moscow that Gorbachev wanted the summit to take place soon. Shevardnadze would be in Washington within two days to see to the final details of the INF Treaty and the summit".

Thus, in spite of outside complications, by the time the summit was set to take place, most of the details relating the INF Treaty had already been worked out. At least a week before the meeting, The New York Times reported that "The Soviet leader and President Reagan are scheduled to sign a treaty Dec. 8 eliminating their nations' shorter-range and medium-range missiles", although the newspaper also said that discussion regarding "reducing long-range, strategic nuclear weapons" was encountering obstacles.

== Summit schedule ==
Date / Time	Location	Main Topics of Discussion	Notes
December 8; 10:45 am – 12:30 pm	The Oval Office; The White House	Human rights, emigration, improvement in relationship between the Soviet Union and the United States, arms control	
December 8; 2:30–3:15 pm	Cabinet Room; The White House	Arms control for conventional and chemical weapons	
December 9; 10:35–10:45 am	Small office next to the Oval Office	The President and General Secretary autograph a baseball for Joe DiMaggio.	Informal meeting between the two leaders.
December 9; 10:55 am – 12:35 pm	The Oval Office	Progress of START discussions, Strategic Defense Initiative (SDI), Anti-Ballistic Missile (ABM) Treaty, Afghanistan, the Iran–Iraq War	
December 10; 12:00–12:15 pm	The Oval Office	Various regional issues	
December 10; 12:40–2:10 pm	Family Dining Room; The White House	Discussed how to characterize progress on regional issues (Vietnamese withdrawal from Cambodia, Afghanistan, Latin America, Africa) in joint statement, Geneva Agreements, North Korea	This meeting was a working luncheon that began directly after the previous meeting. The last moments of this meeting were largely filled with self-congratulatory statements and an exchange of jokes.

== See also ==
- List of Soviet Union–United States summits

== Sources ==
- (2007) "The INF Treaty and the Washington Summit: 20 Years Later". National Security Archive Electronic Briefing Book No. 238. Edited by Sventlana Savranskaya and Thomas Blanton. The National Security Archive (George Washington University).
- Hayward, Steven F. (2010). The Age of Reagan: The Conservative Counterrevolution 1980-1989. New York: Three Rivers Press. ISBN 978-1-4000-5358-2
- Herring, George C. (2008). From Colony to Superpower: U.S. Foreign Relations Since 1776. New York: Oxford University Press. ISBN 978-0-19-507822-0
- Keller, Bill. "Politics and Security Concerns Dash Hopes for Extended Trip by Gorbachev". New York Times (31 October 1987).
- Shipler, David K. "Gorbachev Mix On TV Is Tough But Cooperative". New York Times (1 December 1987).
