= Agreement on the Prevention of Nuclear War =

1973 agreement between the United States and the Soviet Union

The Prevention of Nuclear War Agreement was created to reduce the danger of nuclear war between the United States and the Soviet Union. The agreement was signed at the Washington Summit, on June 22, 1973. The United States and the Soviet Union agreed to reduce the threat of a nuclear war and establish a policy to restrain hostility.

In reality, the agreement had little impact, with Henry Kissinger doubting whether it was "worth the effort" and describing the outcome as only "marginally useful".

== History ==
The agreement was initially presented to US secretary of state Henry Kissinger on his 1972 visit to Moscow by the Soviets. Kissinger described the initial draft as "a dangerous, Soviet maneuverer to lure us into renouncing the use of nuclear weapons, on which the free world's defence after all depended ... Given the Soviet superiority in conventional weapons, such a move would demoralise our allies and deeply disquiet China, who would see it as a sign of the much dreaded U.S.-Soviet collusion ... It was strong stuff. We were being asked to dismantle the military strategy of NATO and at the same time to proclaim a virtual U.S.-Soviet military alliance designed to isolate or impose our will on China or any other country with nuclear aspirations."

With the help of British diplomat Thomas Brimelow, Kissinger presented a counterproposal which he described as "180 degrees removed from his (Brezhnev's) original design. In short, in over a year of negotiation we had transformed the original Soviet proposal of an unconditional renunciation of the use of nuclear weapons against each other into a somewhat banal statement that our objective was peace, applying as well to allies and third countries and premised on restrained international conduct, especially the avoidance of the use or the threat of force".

Unlike the original Soviet proposal, which Kissinger considered entirely unacceptable, the agreed text provided "marginally useful" accommodations to the United States, not specifically in the realm of preventing nuclear war but in Kissinger's specialist subject of geopolitical realpolitik: in his estimation it would make "it impossible for the Soviets to turn on either NATO or the Middle East without violating the agreement. And it even gave us a kind of legal framework for resisting a Soviet attack on China." Nevertheless, Kissinger doubted whether the agreement was "worth the effort."

== Article ==
AGREEMENT BETWEEN THE UNITED STATES OF AMERICA AND THE UNION OF SOVIET SOCIALIST REPUBLICS ON THE PREVENTION OF NUCLEAR WAR

Signed at Washington June 22, 1973 Entered into force June 22, 1973

The United States of America and the Union of Soviet Socialist Republics, hereinafter referred to as the Parties,

Guided by the objectives of strengthening world peace and international security, Conscious that nuclear war would have devastating consequences for mankind, Proceeding from the desire to bring about conditions in which the danger of an outbreak of nuclear war anywhere in the world would be reduced and ultimately eliminated,

Proceeding from their obligations under the Charter of the United Nations regarding the maintenance of peace, refraining from the threat or use of force, and the avoidance of war, and in conformity with the agreements to which either Party has subscribed,

Proceeding from the Basic Principles of Relations between the United States of America and the Union of Soviet Socialist Republics signed in Moscow on May 29, 1972,

Reaffirming that the development of relations between the United States of America and the Union of Soviet Socialist Republics is not directed against other countries and their interests,

Have agreed as follows:

Article I

The United States and the Soviet Union agree that an objective of their policies is to remove the danger of nuclear war and of the use of nuclear weapons.

Accordingly, the Parties agree that they will act in such a manner as to prevent the development of situations capable of causing a dangerous exacerbation of their relations, as to avoid military confrontations, and as to exclude the outbreak of nuclear war between them and between either of the Parties and other countries.

Article II

The Parties agree, in accordance with Article I and to realize the objective stated in that Article, to proceed from the premise that each Party will refrain from the threat or use of force against the other Party, against the allies of the other Party and against other countries, in circumstances which may endanger international peace and security. The Parties agree that they will be guided by these considerations in the formulation of their foreign policies and in their actions in the field of international relations.

Article III

The Parties undertake to develop their relations with each other and with other countries in a way consistent with the purposes of this Agreement.

Article IV

If at any time relations between the Parties or between either Party and other countries appear to involve the risk of a nuclear conflict, or if relations between countries not parties to this Agreement appear to involve the risk of nuclear war between the United States of America and the Union of Soviet Socialist Republics or between either Party and other countries, the United States and the Soviet Union, acting in accordance with the provisions of this Agreement, shall immediately enter into urgent consultations with each other and make every effort to avert this risk.

Article V

Each Party shall be free to inform the Security Council of the United Nations, the Secretary General of the United Nations and the Governments of allied or other countries of the progress and outcome of consultations initiated in accordance with Article IV of this Agreement.

Article VI

Nothing in this Agreement shall affect or impair:

     (a) the inherent right of individual or collective self-defense as envisaged by Article 51 of the Charter of the United Nations,*

     (b) the provisions of the Charter of the United Nations, including those relating to the maintenance or restoration of international peace and security, and

     (c) the obligations undertaken by either Party towards its allies or other countries in treaties, agreements, and other appropriate documents.

Article VII

This Agreement shall be of unlimited duration.

Article VIII

This Agreement shall enter into force upon signature.

DONE at Washington on June 22, 1973, in two copies, each in the English and Russian languages, both texts being equally authentic.

FOR THE UNITED STATES OF AMERICA: RICHARD NIXON President of the United States of America

FOR THE UNION OF SOVIET SOCIALIST REPUBLICS: L.I. BREZHNEV General Secretary of the Central Committee, CPSU

____________

- TS 993; 59 Stat. 1044.

It was viewed as a preliminary step toward preventing the outbreak of nuclear war or military conflict by adopting an attitude of international cooperation.

Together with the Basic Principles Agreement and the Strategic Arms Limitation Talks (SALT), it represented an attempt to establish 'rules' for superpower competition during the Cold War. The bilateral agreement with multilateral implications outlines the general conduct of both countries and toward third world countries. The Parties agreed that in a situation which threatened to escalate into direct nuclear confrontation, whether it be directly or by proxy in the Third World, to urgently consult with each other.

The agreement basically covers two main areas:

1. It outlines the general conduct of both countries toward each other and toward third countries regarding the avoidance of nuclear war. In this respect it is a bilateral agreement with multilateral implications.
2. The Parties agreed that in a situation in which the two great nuclear countries find themselves in a nuclear confrontation or in which, either as a result of their policies toward each other or as the result of developments elsewhere in the world, there is a danger of a nuclear confrontation between them or any other country, they are committed to consult with each other in order to avoid this risk.

-U.S. State Department, Agreement Between The United States of America and The Union of Soviet Socialist Republics on the Prevention of Nuclear War

== Breakdown of Articles ==
Article I

The United States and the Soviet Union agree in principle that an agreement must be reached to limit the fear and danger of nuclear war.

Article II

In regards to Article I, the United States and Soviet Union will observe and abide by current foreign policies. Additionally, both countries will refrain from using force against each other or their allies.

Article III

Another purpose of this agreement is to keep relations open between the United States, Soviet Union, and their allies.

Article IV

In the case of nuclear threats or force being escalated by any and all parties involved in this agreement, and those not, the United States and Soviet Union will immediately meet to try to resolve any issues and avoid nuclear conflict by any means necessary.

Article V

In any case of nuclear escalation, either side involved has total freedom to alert the Security Council of the United Nations, along with the Secretary General of the United Nations. As well as, any and all governments involved to the outcome of the negotiations as mentioned in Article IV.

Article VI

Anything discussed and agreed upon in this agreement will not affect or limit Article 51 of the charter of the United Nations, provisions of the charter of the United Nations, that discuss international peace and security, as well as, other treaties, agreements, and documents by either party previously with its allies.

Article VII

There is an unlimited lifetime of this agreement.

Article VIII

Once signed by both parties, the agreement will be in immediate effect.

== See also ==
- Cold War (1962-1991)
- Cuban Missile Crisis
- Nuclear warfare
- Atomic Age
- Deterrence theory
- Doomsday clock
- Doomsday event
- Essentials of Post–Cold War Deterrence
- International Court of Justice advisory opinion on the Legality of the Threat or Use of Nuclear Weapons
- Leonid Brezhnev
- No first use policy
- Nuclear holocaust
- Nuclear War (card game)
- Nuclear weapons in popular culture
- Strategic Arms Limitation Talks (SALT)
- Strategic Defense Initiative
- Weapon of mass destruction
- World War III
- Risks to civilization, humans and planet Earth
- Causes of hypothetical future disasters

== Citations ==
- "Prevention of Nuclear War Agreement". Federation of American Scientists. Accessed February 9, 2010.
