= Oreanda =

Oreanda Ореанда
- Urban-type settlement
- The Khrestova peak of the Crimean Mountains located in Oreanda.

- Location of Oreanda in Crimea
- Coordinates: 44°27′31″N 34°08′12″E
- Republic: Crimea
- Municipality: Yalta Municipality
- Town status: 1971

Area
  - Total: 1.36 km^{2} (0.53 sq mi)
- Elevation: 197 m (646 ft)

Population (2014)
  - Total: 835
  - Density: 614/km^{2} (1,590/sq mi)
- Time zone: UTC+4 (MSK)
- Postal code: 98658
- Area code: +380 654
- Climate: Cfb
- Website: http://rada.gov.ua/

Oreanda (Ukrainian and Russian: Ореанда; Crimean Tatar: Oreanda) is an urban-type settlement in the Yalta Municipality of the Autonomous Republic of Crimea, a territory recognized by a majority of countries as part of Ukraine and annexed by Russia as the Republic of Crimea.

Oreanda is administratively subordinate to the Livadiya Settlement Council. The urban-type settlement's population was 887 as of the 2001 Ukrainian census. Current population: 835 (2014 Census).

== Geography ==
Oreanda is located on Crimea's southern shore at an elevation of 197 metres (646 ft). The settlement is located 5 km (3.1 mi) from Yalta. The Khrestova peak of the Crimean Mountains is located in Oreanda.

== History ==
Oreanda was first mentioned in Peter Simon Pallas's 1793 book Journey through various provinces of the Russian Empire as Urgenda (Cyrillic: Ургенда).

In the first half of the 19th century, Oreanda belonged to the House of Potocki; it later became a part of the Russian tsar's territory. From 1842 to 1852, a Greek Revival palace was built in Oreanda by architect Andrei Stackenschneider. The American writer Mark Twain once stayed at the palace before it burned down in 1882. Leonid Brezhnev had a house in Oreanda which President Richard Nixon visited in 1974 following the Moscow Summit.

In the 1940s-1950s, two sanatoriums were built in Oreanda, one of which was designed by Soviet Constructivist architect Moisei Ginzburg.

== In culture ==
Key parts in Anton Chekhov's short story The Lady with the Dog, published in 1899, take place in Oreanda.
