= Moscow Summit (1974) =

Meeting of the US and USSR

- Host country: Soviet Union
- Dates: June 28 – July 3, 1974
- Cities: Moscow; Yalta
- Venues: Kremlin Palace; Oreanda
- Participants: (Soviet Union) Leonid Brezhnev (United States) Richard Nixon
- Follows: Washington Summit (1973)
- Precedes: Vladivostok Summit Meeting on Arms Control

The Moscow Summit of 1974 was a summit meeting between President Richard Nixon of the United States and General Secretary Leonid Brezhnev of the Communist Party of the Soviet Union. It was held June 28–1 July 1974. It featured the signing of the Threshold Test Ban Treaty (TTBT). The summit followed the Washington Summit the previous year as well as considerable progress in U.S.-Soviet relations made by Nixon in the previous two years. The visit was the final one of Nixon's presidency as he would give his resignation speech in August of that year.

== Events ==
Nixon arrived at Vnukovo International Airport in Moscow on June 27 to a military welcome ceremony performed by members of the 99th Independent Commandant's Battalion. He was also met with cheering crowds before he went to the Grand Kremlin Palace for a state dinner that evening. In the three day period that followed, he held talks with Leonid Brezhnev, Foreign Minister Andrei Gromyko, and other Soviet officials which culminated in the signing of an economic agreement that would last a decade on 30 June. Nixon and Brezhnev from there met once again in Simferopol and Yalta, cities in the Crimea region of the Ukrainian SSR. It was rumored that officials from the White House did not want Nixon to go to Yalta due to adverse connotations with the Yalta Conference of 1945. They met at Brezhnev's residence of Oreanda. They discussed a proposed mutual defense pact, détente, and MIRVs. Nixon considered proposing a comprehensive test-ban treaty, however felt that it would be completed during his presidency. Official contacts were made between the Supreme Soviet of the Soviet Union and the United States Congress. At the end of the summit, Nixon undertook a visit to Minsk in Belarusian SSR to attend celebrations in honor of the 30th anniversary of the liberation of Belarus. He was hosted by regional First Secretary Pyotr Masherov, who accompanied Nixon when he laid a wreath on Victory Square. He was also accorded a state dinner by Chairman of the Presidium of the Supreme Soviet of Belarus Fyodor Surganov.

== See also ==
- List of Soviet Union–United States summits (1943 to 1991)
