= Thomas Brimelow, Baron Brimelow =

British diplomat

Thomas Brimelow

Thomas Brimelow, Baron Brimelow GCMG OBE (25 October 1915 – 2 August 1995, London, United Kingdom) was a British diplomat.

He served as Ambassador to Poland (1966–69), Permanent Under-Secretary at the British Foreign Office (1973–75), and Member of the European Parliament (1977–78).

Alistair Horne describes him as "cherubic, and unflappable, but with a piercing intellect" and "the Foreign Office expect on the Soviets, and Russian behaviour". He was also known to be passionate about equality of opportunity and a less stratified society in Great Britain.

He played an important role alongside US Secretary of State Henry Kissinger in negotiating the 1973 Agreement on the Prevention of Nuclear War between the United States and the USSR which, according to Kissinger, "owed, in fact, more to British than American expertise". Kissinger described Brimelow's role as "an example of the Anglo-American 'special relationship' at its best, even at a time when the incumbent Prime Minister (Heath) was not among its advocates. There was no other government which we would have dealt with so openly, exchanged ideas so freely, or in effect permitted to participate in our own deliberations."

He was educated at New Mills Grammar School and New College, Oxford. His daughter, Alison, was the fifth President of the European Patent Office.

Brimelow was created a life peer on 29 January 1976 taking the title Baron Brimelow, of Tyldesley in the County of Lancashire.
