= Vladivostok Summit Meeting on Arms Control =

Arms control meeting between the Soviet Union and the United States

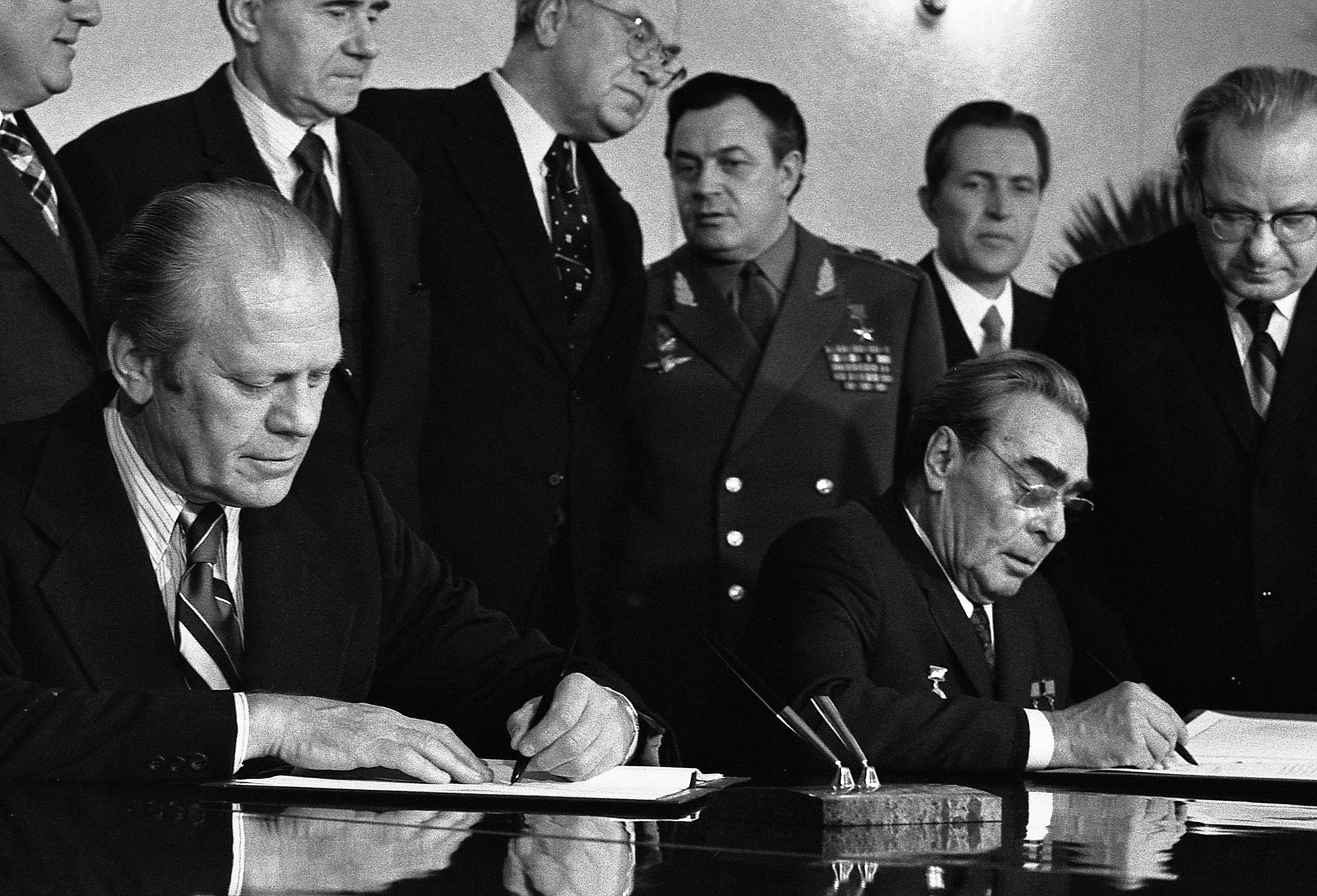
- President Gerald Ford and General Secretary Leonid Brezhnev sign a Joint Communiqué
- Host country: Soviet Union
- Date: November 23–24, 1974
- Cities: Vladivostok
- Venues: Okeanskaya Sanatorium
- Participants: (Soviet Union) Leonid Brezhnev (United States) Gerald Ford
- Follows: Moscow Summit (1974)
- Precedes: Vienna Summit (1979)

The Vladivostok Summit Meeting on Arms Control was a two-day summit held on November 23 and 24, 1974, in Vladivostok, Primorsky Krai, Russia, for the purpose of extending arms control provisions between the Soviet Union and the United States.

After a series of talks between American President Gerald Ford and Soviet Foreign Minister Andrei Gromyko in Washington and American Secretary of State Henry Kissinger's visit to Moscow, Ford traveled to Vladivostok to meet with Soviet General Secretary Leonid Brezhnev directly. The two heads of state agreed to terms that would limit both nations an "equal aggregate number" of various weapons, including strategic nuclear delivery vehicles (SNDVs), intercontinental ballistic missiles (ICBMs), and submarine-launched ballistic missiles (SLBMs) fitted with multiple independently targetable reentry vehicles (MIRVs).

== Background ==
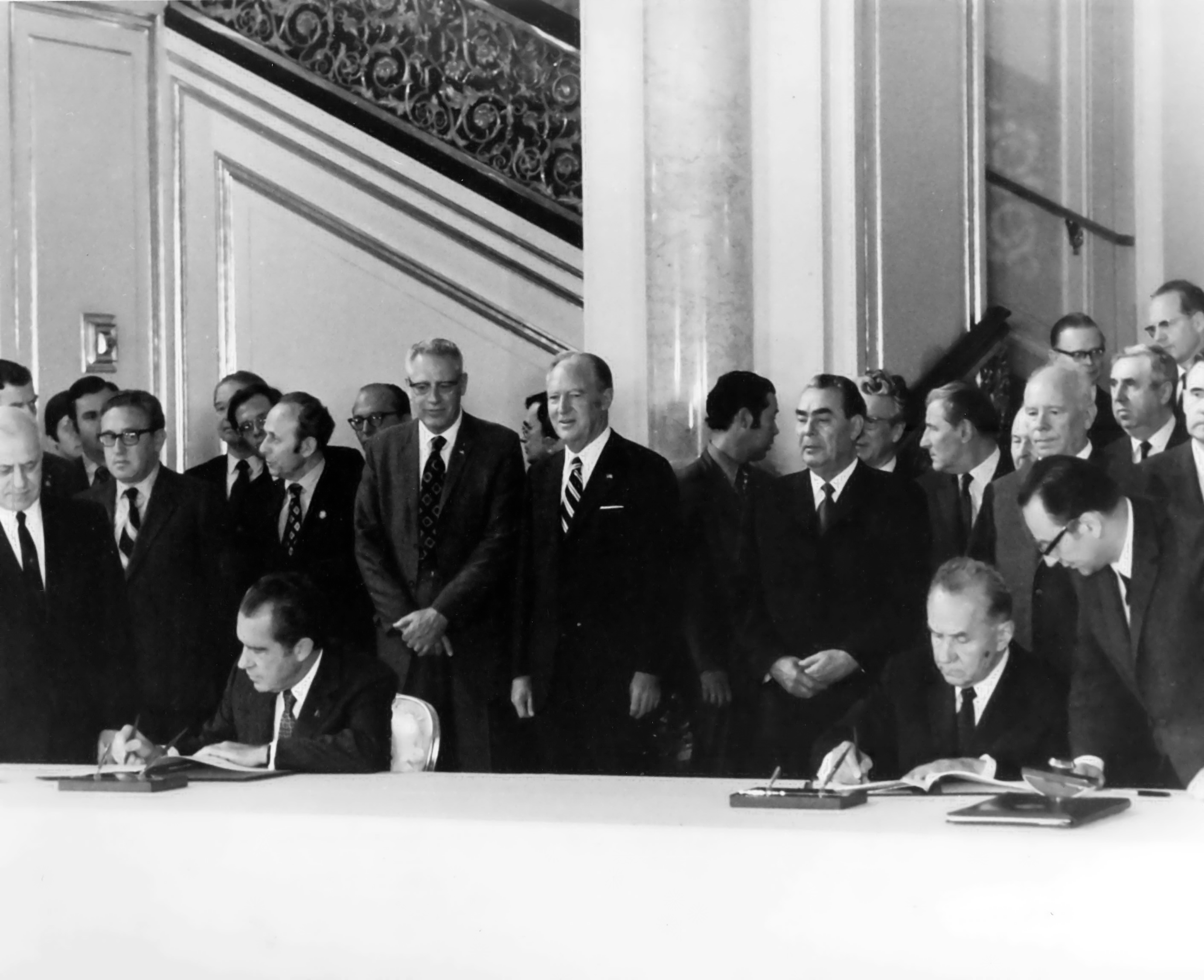
American President Richard Nixon during the bilateral summit in Moscow on May 24, 1972

Diagram depicting the different stages of an MIRV missile path from launch to detonation

The Soviet Union and the United States had first reached an agreement on a strategic arms limitation in May 1972 (SALT I) which limited the number of ballistic missiles that each nation could deploy – 2,360 for the Soviet Union, and 1,710 for the United States. The agreement was not comprehensive, however, as it did not restrict the number of heavy bombers or missiles equipped with multiple warheads (MIRVs) for either country, which by 1974 worked to the advantage of the United States. Because SALT I was due to expire in October 1977, both the Soviet Union and the United States were interested in reaching a more permanent and comprehensive agreement, but initial efforts made by President Richard Nixon and Gromyko were not successful.

Eventually, a visit to Moscow by Kissinger in October 1974 made significant headway and allowed for the creation of a general framework for a SALT II pact before Ford even arrived in Vladivostok. Before the Vladivostok Summit began, Ford noted that they only "had to button down two things": the number of launchers and MIRVs to be permitted for each country, and whether each nation would be given an equal quota for both or if a differential would be used that would allow the Soviets more launchers and the Americans more MIRVs. According to Dobrynin, this potential discrepancy was because the American and Soviet arsenals were "from the beginning completely different in both structure and deployment". The United States had a "strategic triad" of nuclear weapons that could be delivered from land, sea, or air (largely due to the blue-water United States Navy and strategic American airbases located around the world), while the Soviet Union had relied on large, long-ranged missiles because its weapons were mostly restricted to its own continental territory.

Going into the Summit, Dobrynin alluded to the Soviet desire to find "a tricky balance between the larger number of Soviet land-based missiles...and the greater quantity of superior American MIRVed missiles". The Americans desired to instead have equal numbers of weapons allowed for both countries, a policy known as "numerical equivalency", although Kissinger was more optimistic than Ford about the prospects of achieving this. According to Kissinger, the Vladivostok Summit marked "the only time in Ford's presidency that he would be representing a united position of his government on SALT". Even if an agreement could be reached, he warned the President, "the domestic attack on SALT would continue".

According to Anatoly Dobrynin, the Soviet Ambassador to the United States, it was Ford who proposed the Summit take place in Vladivostok, in part because of a documentary he had watched at the Soviet embassy in Washington about tigers living in the Ussuri taiga in Siberia. After Ford inquired about how far Vladivostok was from Moscow, Dobrynin answered that "New York was closer to Moscow than Moscow was to Vladivostok". According to Dobrynin, Ford "was amazed by the size of my country and said few Americans could comprehend this". Kissinger was also excited by the prospects of the Summit taking place in Vladivostok, according to Dobrynin, both because it could be tied in with Ford's trip to Japan and thus "appear less deliberately staged" and also because of the city's close proximity to the People's Republic of China, which was the other major concern of Kissinger's "triangular diplomacy".

== Arrival in Vladivostok ==
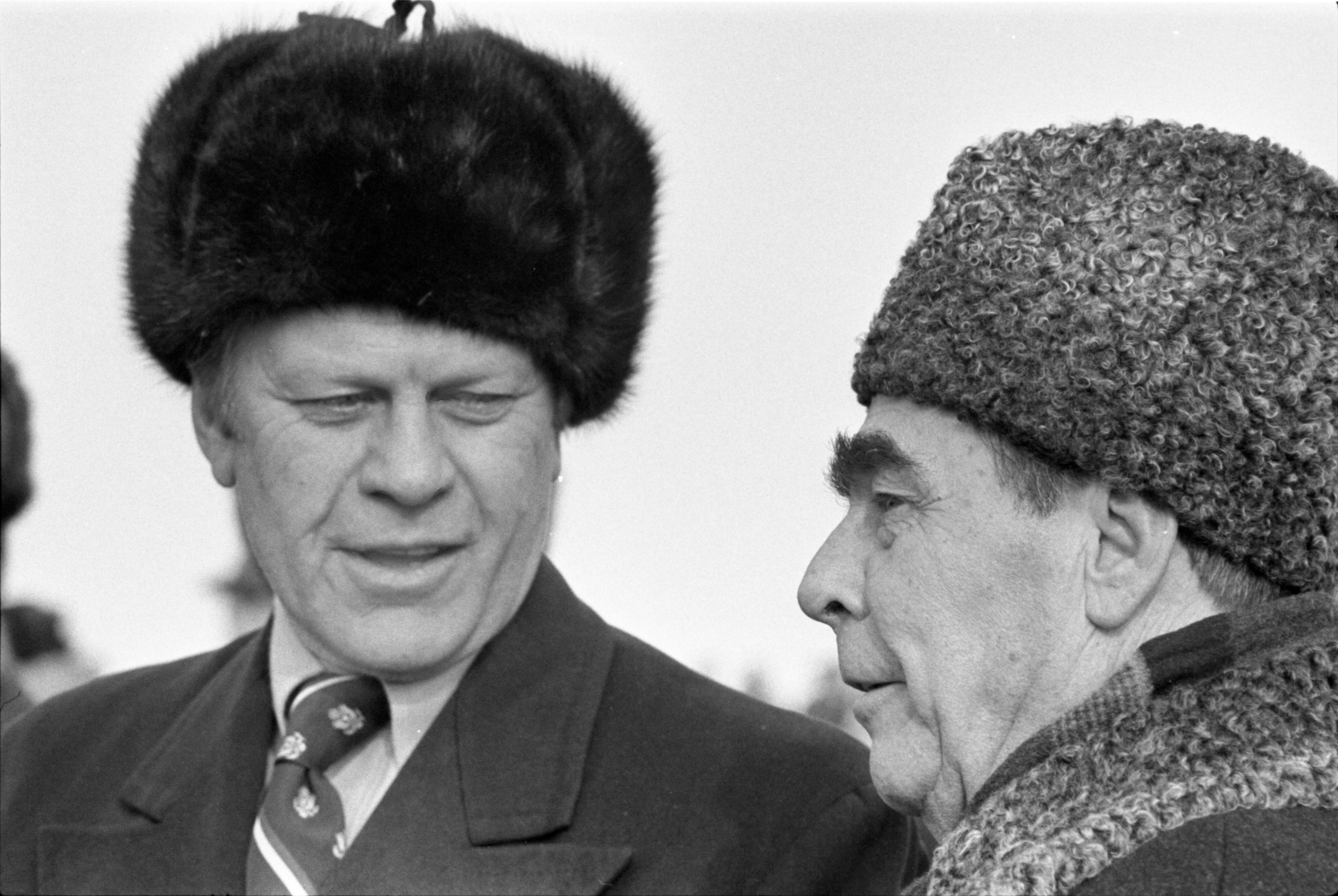
Brezhnev greets Ford upon his arrival at Vozdvizhenka Airbase on November 23, 1974.

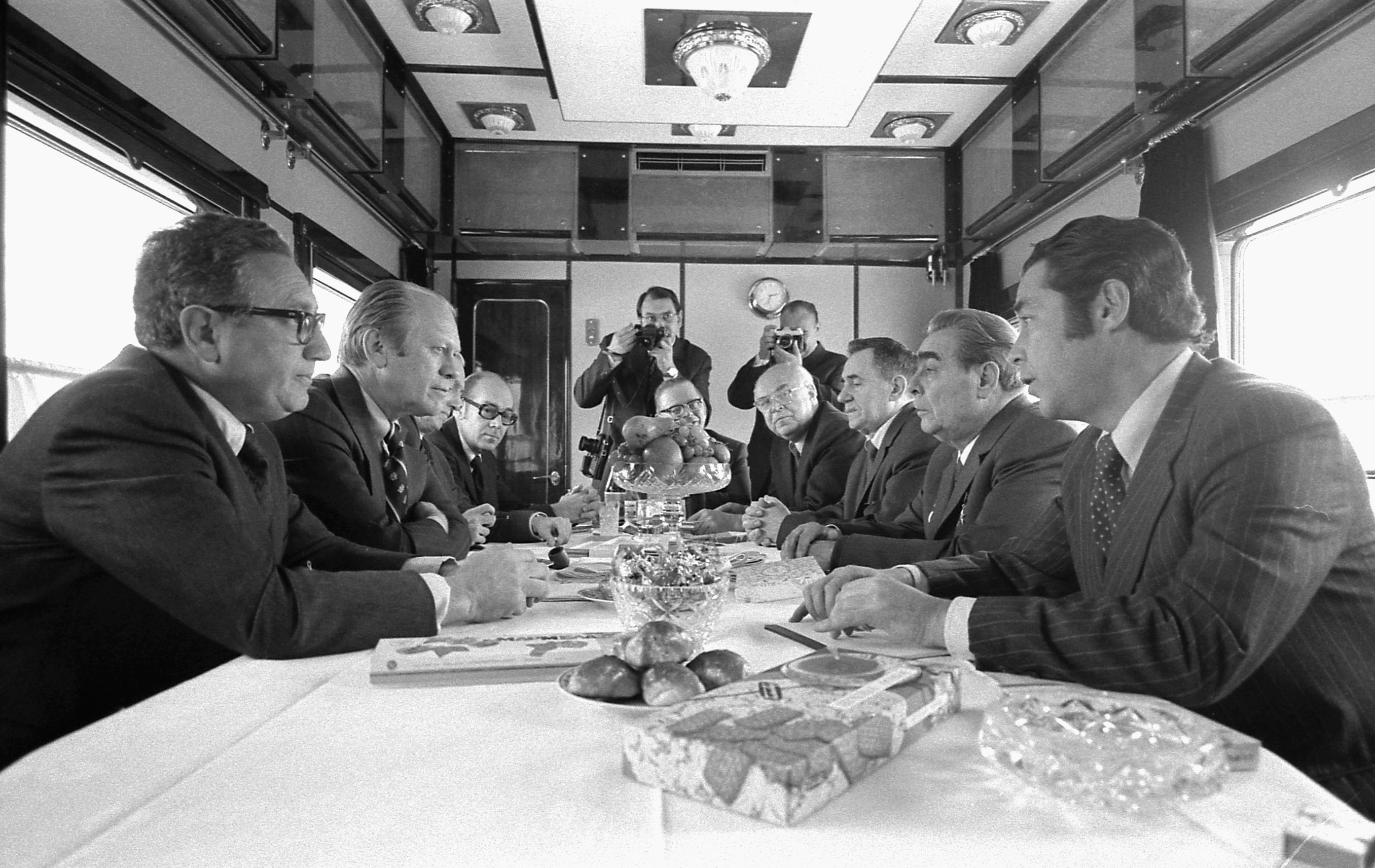
The American and Soviet delegations in conversation aboard a Soviet train en route to Okeanskaya

Ford and the American delegation arrived at Vozdvizhenka Airbase on the morning of November 23, where they were greeted by Brezhnev and Gromyko. Although the Americans were flying in from Seoul, according to Kissinger they "had to double back to Tokyo" because the Soviet Union did not have diplomatic relations with South Korea at the time. According to Ford, the Soviets had themselves just completed a four thousand mile trip from Moscow by rail, but according to Dobrynin they too had flown: they had to land at a different airport in the region because of a snowstorm, however, and then took an electric train to complete the last stage of their journey to Vozdvizhenka.

According to Ford, he and Brezhnev "got along well...from the moment we met". Their small talk touched on their mutual previous experiences as sportsmen, as Ford and Brezhnev had played American football and association football, respectively. The heads of state also began to discuss policy on the train and, according to Kissinger, Brezhnev was at first surprised by Ford's "straight to the point" style because it differed so much from Nixon's more familiar "elliptical approach". Brezhnev then began making points on arms control, the Middle East, and the European Security Conference before he made an emotional appeal that struck to "the heart of the Cold War dilemma": according to Kissinger, he lamented the amount of money both the Soviet Union and the United States were spending on the arms race, calling it "billions that would be much better spent for the benefit of the people". While Kissinger appreciated Brezhnev's "ruminations", he believed Ford was uninterested in "the general philosophy of arms control" and rather preferred to "discuss these issues in specific terms".

The venue which was chosen for the meeting was the Okeanskaya Sanatorium (Russian: Санаторий «Океанский»), a health spa used by vacationing personnel from local military bases located in 85 Makovskogo Street in the northern suburbs of Vladivostok. The train trip from the airport to the Okeanskaya Sanatorium, the site of the summit, took an hour and a half. While Ford spent the time with Brezhnev, he noticed that Kissinger occupied himself with the cookies, pastries, and mints set out on a table in the dining car, much to the amusement of his Soviet hosts: in Ford's estimation, "he must have finished off three plates". During the trip, Brezhnev suffered a seizure, but he was immediately tended to by his doctor, Evgeny Chazov, and was able to participate in the negotiations as planned. After the Summit, Brezhnev suffered another more severe seizure on his return journey to Moscow, and according to Dobrynin it was at that point that "the long countdown to his fatal illness had begun". At the end of their train trip, the American and Soviet delegations arrived at the sanatorium, that Dobrynin described as "a rural community some twenty kilometers from Vladivostok". While Ford described the town and its Sanatorium as looking "like an abandoned YMCA camp in the Catskills", he also noted that Brezhnev did not seem concerned about its appearance. Kissinger described the Sanatorium as a "large stone building" and noted that it was surrounded by "small cottages built of wood".

== Day one: November 23 ==
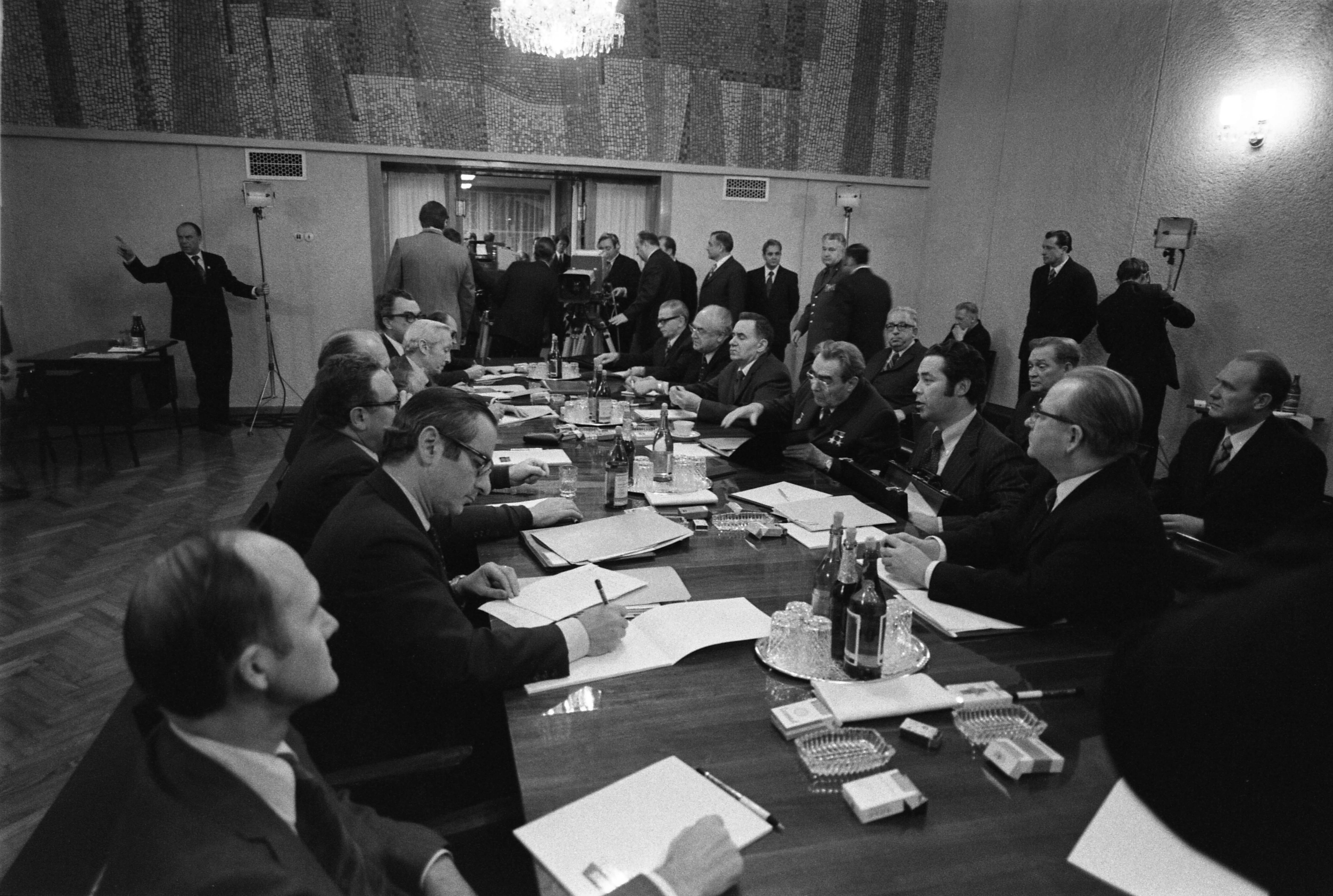
Negotiations on the first day of the Summit took place in the conference hall at the Okeanskaya Sanatorium.

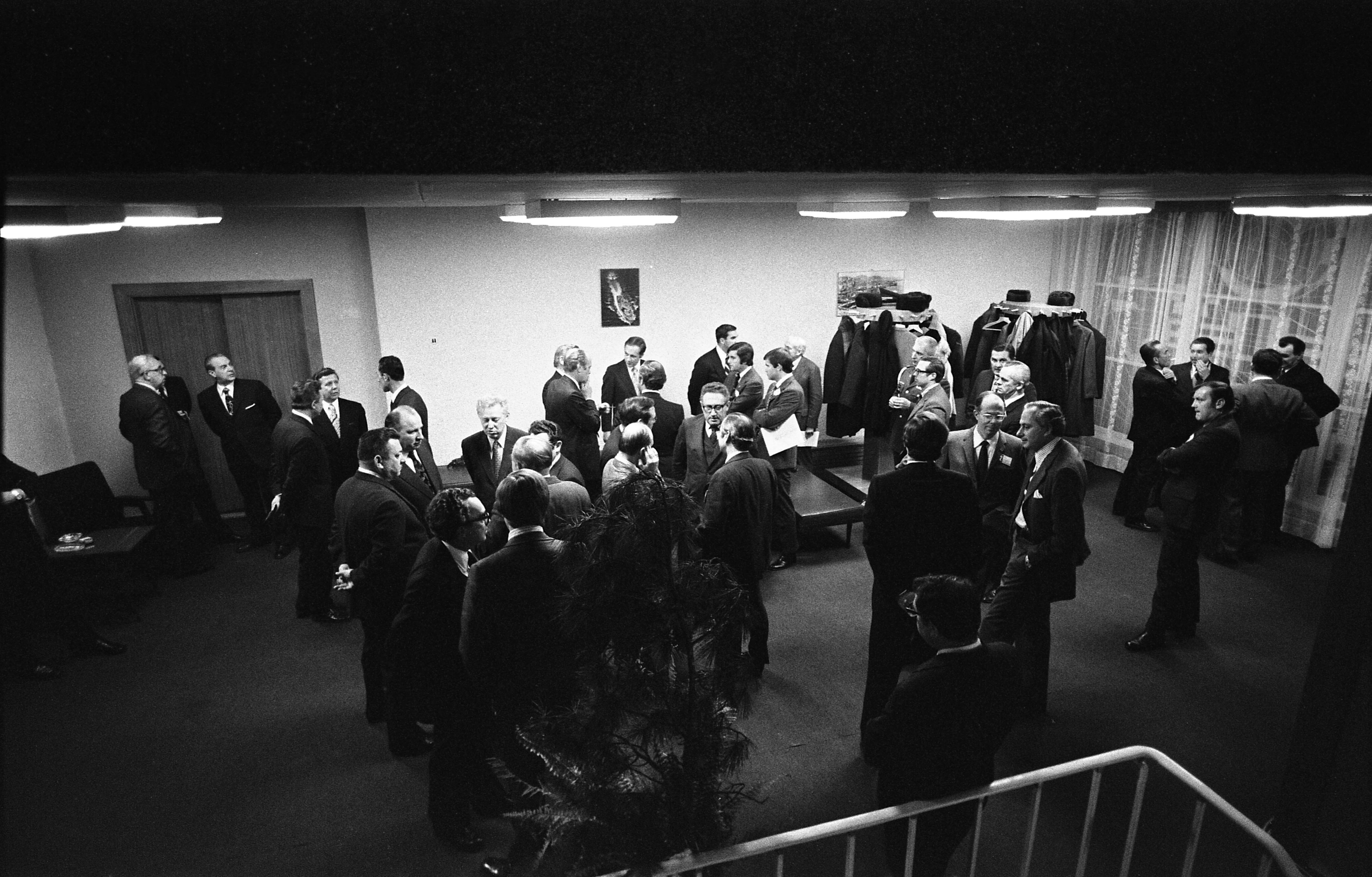
The American and Soviet delegations taking a break for refreshments during the long nighttime meeting on November 23

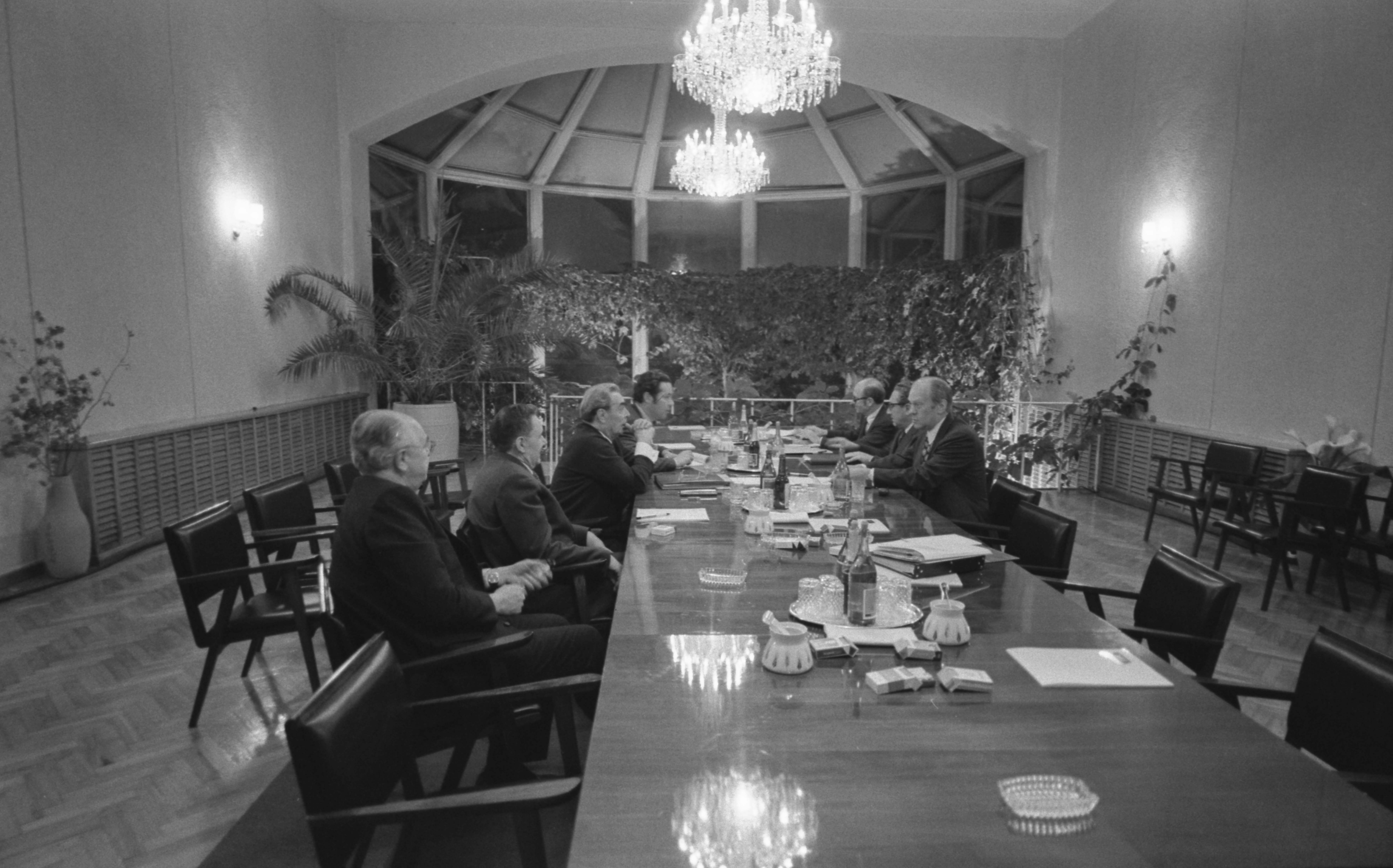
The negotiations on November 23 were so productive that they extended into the early hours of November 24.

According to Kissinger, the first day of negotiations were held in the Sanatorium's winter garden. Before the actual negotiations began, Kissinger conferred with Ford about strategy, suggesting that the American position should be "polite but firm". In regards to negotiating with Brezhnev, Kissinger advised Ford that the "best approach is to lay out frankly and soberly our position and let him absorb it". They both prepared for a confrontational stance presented by Brezhnev and his aides, which Ford believed would be a calculated effort "to see if I would bend or fight back". According to Dobrynin, "Kissinger played the leading role in the deliberations because Ford did not yet know all the details". Kissinger himself, however, referred to Ford's involvement in the negotiations as "technical", contrasting Ford's approach with Nixon's tendency to let Kissinger handle the intricacies of negotiating.

After both sides gave their opening statements at the beginning of negotiations proper, they quickly began agreeing on arms control measures that limited each country to 2,400 ballistic missiles and 1,320 MIRVs. Because many of the key points had already been agreed to before the Summit began, Kissinger likened the developments to a Kabuki play: "extremely stylized with a near-traditional script and a foreordained outcome". Dobrynin referred to these agreements as a "compromise" from the Soviet perspective, but noted that it "eliminated what in our view had been the principal deficiency of the SALT I agreement".

The negotiations, which at times became extremely technical (Kissinger, for instance, noted a lengthy discussion of the implications of enlarging missile silos by 15%), slowed down as more contentious topics came up. The first of these involved the United States, including its Forward Base System with F-4, F-111, and FB-111 fighters, its nuclear weapons deployed in Western Europe, its production of Trident-equipped Ohio-class submarines, and its plans to build the B-1 bomber. While the Soviet Union was concerned by all of these American weapons, the United States was able to negotiate from a position of strength and preserved all of these advantages: regarding the submarines and the B-1, Ford successfully convinced his Soviet counterparts that his country's "national security...demanded that we push forward with both."

Conversely, the American delegation "wanted the USSR to relinquish a significant number of so-called heavy, land-based ICBMs", in the words of Gromyko. According to him, Brezhnev urged his American counterparts to "adopt a realistic approach", stating that the "Soviet Union is not happy that the USA has nuclear weapons in forward positions in Europe and in other regions close to our country. Yet the American leaders will not even discuss this. In such circumstances, the American request concerning Soviet ICBMs cannot be discussed either." Ford then finally withdrew on this issue after consulting his aides and military advisors, a decision that according to Gromyko greatly enhanced the possibility for agreement on SALT II and contributed "to a climate of moderation in Soviet-US relations in which each side took account of the other's interests".

According to Kissinger, Brezhnev also brought up "his pet scheme of nuclear condominium between the United States and the Soviet Union" during negotiations. Kissinger described the American position as one "determined to avoid any impression of a Soviet-American condominium", although Ford tempered this stance to a declaration of "we never know where we might go".

After this somewhat strained but greatly productive discussion concerning arms, the negotiations between the two delegations became more general, with Ford admitting the challenge posed by economic difficulties in the United States and Brezhnev explaining that some members of his Politburo did not think détente was a prudent strategy, whom he knew would be highly critical of him if he made too many concessions to the Americans. Then, somewhat to Ford's surprise, Brezhnev began talking in considerable detail about the United States Congress, which the Soviets had come to see as potentially detrimental to their ability to negotiate with American presidents. Trying to plan for the future, Brezhnev asked Ford, "What kind of a Congress will you be dealing with for the next two years?", to which Ford replied, "Mr. General Secretary...I can only say that my fingers are crossed."

== Breaks between sessions ==
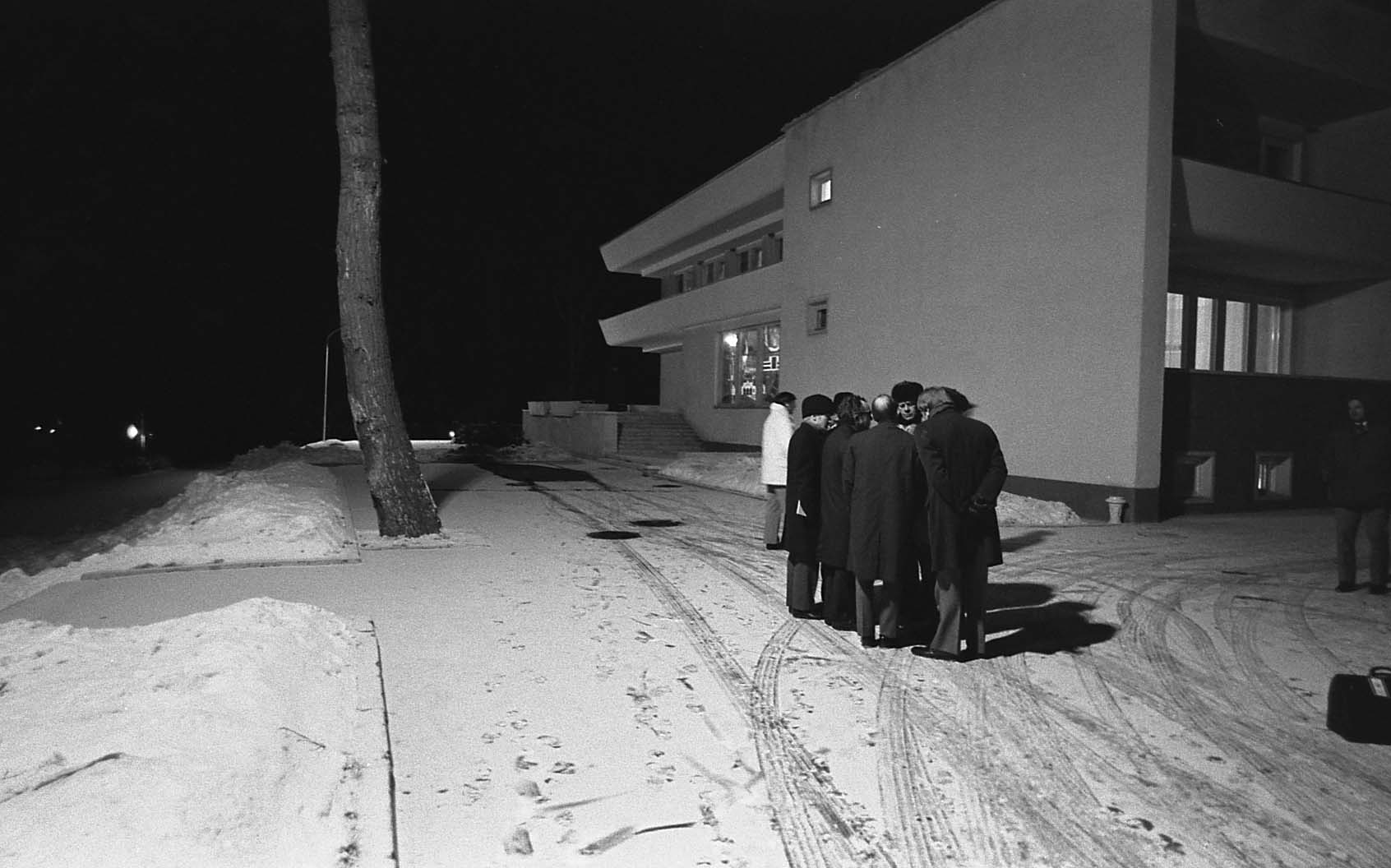
The American delegation conversing during one of the breaks, standing outside the Sanatorium to avoid the possibility of being bugged

The first day of negotiations was originally planned to last just two hours, from 6:00pm to 8:00pm VLAT, after which the two delegations would break for dinner and then retire for the night before resuming talks the next morning. The negotiations had been so productive, however, that the Soviets and the Americans agreed to forgo dinner and continue the talks, ultimately taking three short breaks that evening instead of one long one to eat. The Americans, afraid that the Sanatorium had been bugged, elected to take their breaks outside, despite the sub-zero temperatures. During one of the breaks, Brezhnev presented Ford with a portrait painting of the American president, and while Ford was quite impressed by the quality of the work he did not think it looked much like him. When he presented the portrait to a group of his American colleagues, photographer David Hume Kennerly joked: "Hey now, would you look at that? They gave you a picture of Frank Sinatra." Ford was not amused.

The first day negotiations did not end until after midnight, and as Ford was waiting for a much-delayed meal to be served, he remembered that his alma mater, the University of Michigan, was playing the Ohio State University in football that day. Due to the time difference, the game would be occurring during the early morning hours in Vladivostok. Ford then instructed his military aide Bob Barrett to wake him up at 6:00am the next morning with the result of the game, which he did: "Twelve to ten". Ford responded: "Wait a minute. Who had the twelve, and who had the ten?" Barrett continued: "I was afraid you'd ask me that." It was clear to Ford that Ohio State had won, even before Barrett filled him in on the details of the game, including Michigan's last-second missed field goal.

== Day two: November 24 ==
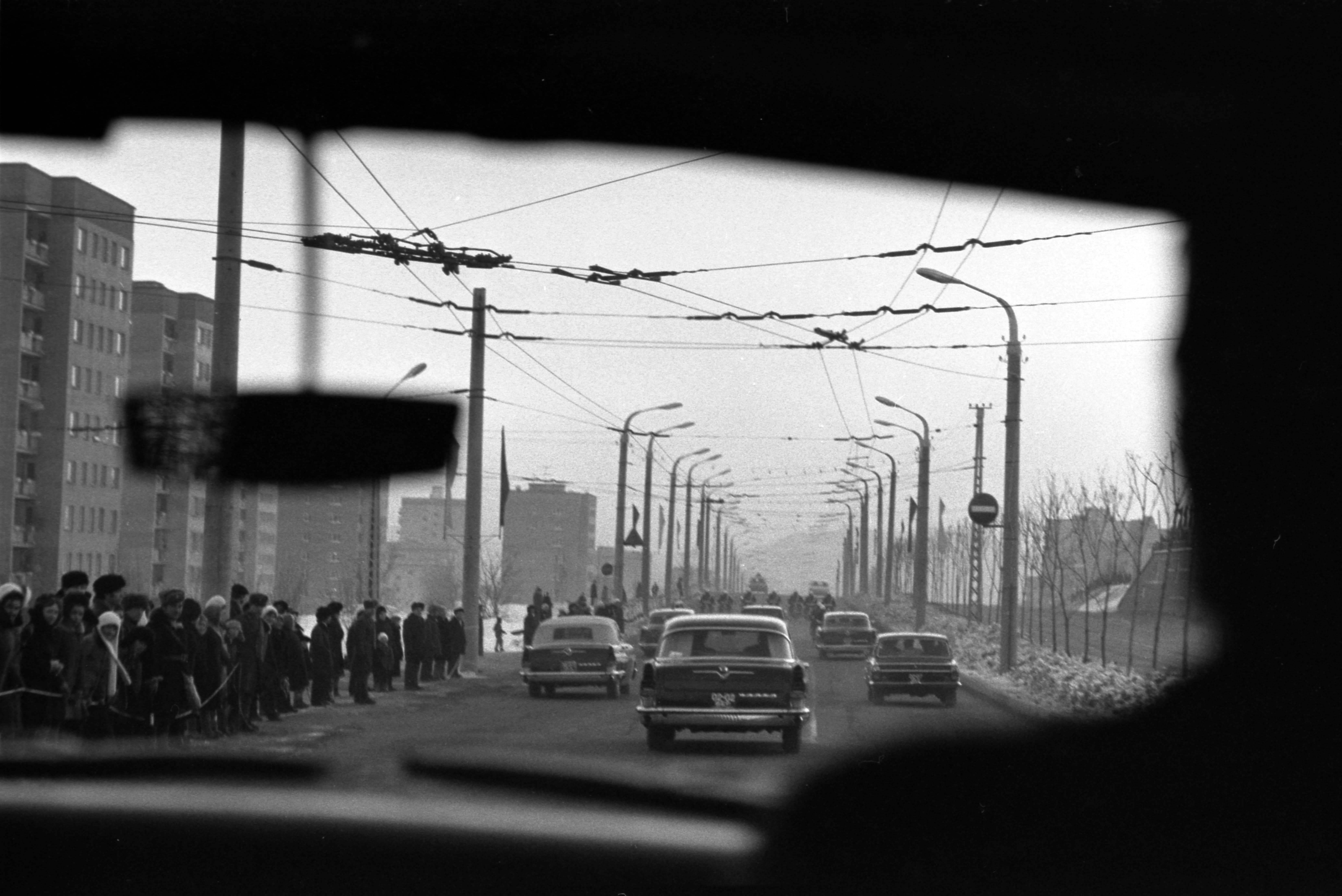
The Soviet delegation leads its American counterpart on a tour of Vladivostok by motorcade.

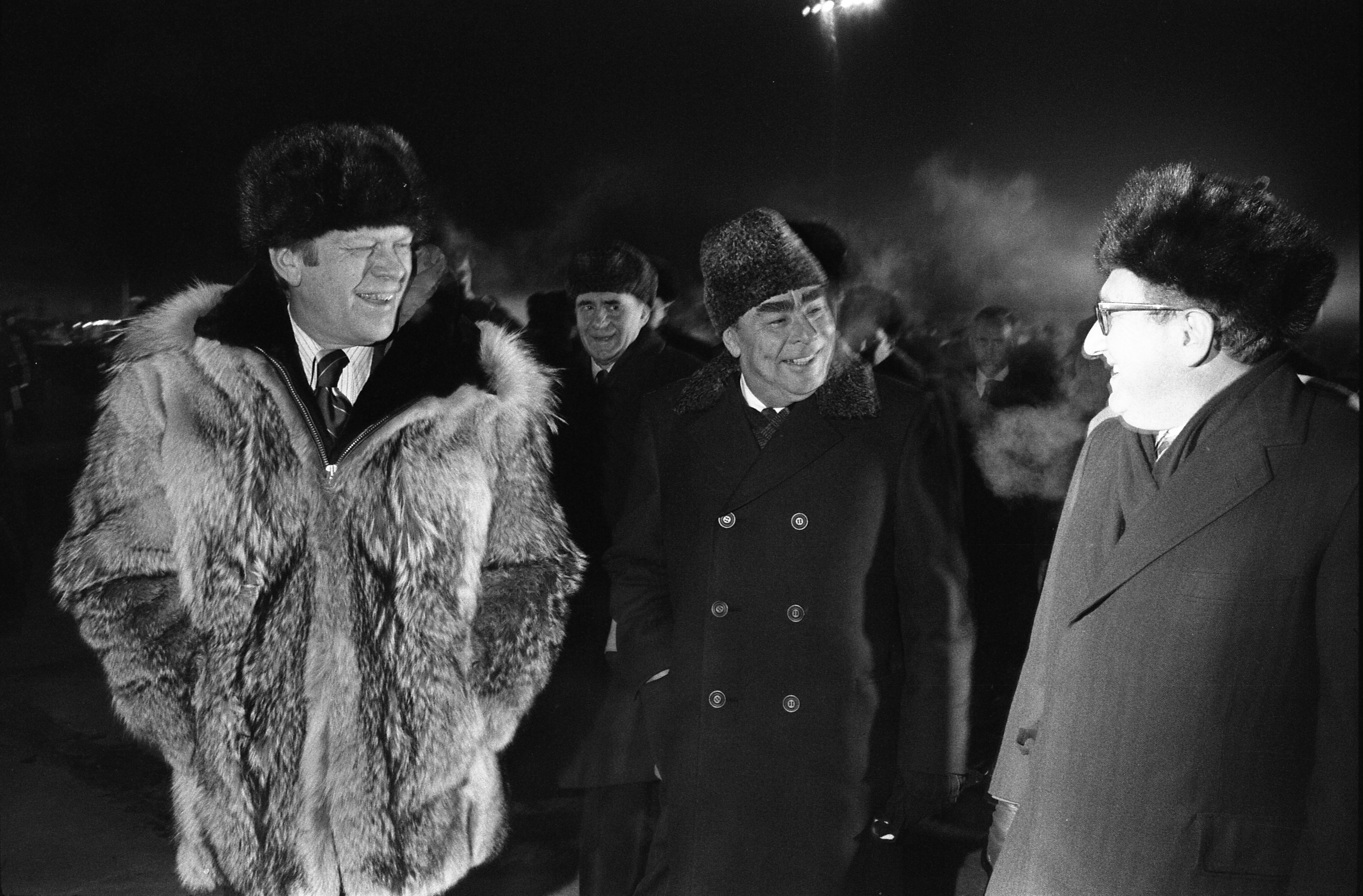
The delegations on the tarmac at Vozdvizhenka Airbase, just moments before Ford informally concluded the Summit by giving his wolfskin coat to Brezhnev

The second day of negotiations began shortly after 10:00am, and it focused primarily on developments in the Middle East, efforts to reduce the strength of both American and Soviet forces in Europe, and Jewish emigration from the Soviet Union. According to Kissinger, Gromyko took the lead Soviet role in negotiations that Brezhnev had performed the day before. While Ford described the tenor of the discussions as candid, he also admitted that there were no major breakthroughs. According to Dobrynin, the talks were "intense and heated but genuinely businesslike, and without any of the usual protocol formalities". In Kissinger's words, the second day of negotiations reflected how "essentially theological the SALT debate had become": the Soviet Union attempted to limit their weapons to a level they "could probably not reach" in exchange for limiting the Americans below a number "for which we had no plan". Nonetheless, Ford was euphoric because of the successes achieved the night before, and according to him Brezhnev "shared my enthusiasm". After a few minor issues were ironed out, the two heads of state were able to sign a SALT II accord.

That afternoon, after the formal negotiations concluded, Brezhnev invited the American delegation on a tour of Vladivostok. Ford enjoyed what he described as a "natural and uninhibited" conversation with Brezhnev during the tour, and his only regret about it was that he did not have more time to see and explore the city: to him, Vladivostok was reminiscent of San Francisco. Kissinger also saw the resemblance, noting that Vladivostok "bore little resemblance to the teeming, hyperactive metropolises of Japan and Korea" he had seen before arriving in the Soviet Union.

During the tour, Brezhnev unexpectedly grasped Ford's hand and began talking about the Soviet experience during World War II, telling Ford that "I do not want to inflict that upon my people again". Ford responded that "I believe we made very significant progress", to which Brezhnev replied "it's our responsibility, yours and mine, on behalf of our countries, to achieve the finalization of the document". Ford was optimistic about that possibility, remarking: "We have made so much headway. This is a big step forward to prevent a nuclear holocaust." Brezhnev agreed, and then characterized the importance of the Summit and the resulting document as "an opportunity to protect not only the people of our two countries but, really, all mankind".

Following the tour of Vladivostok, the American and Soviet delegations returned to Vozdvizhenka Airbase by train, where Air Force One was waiting for the Americans. Ford was wearing a wolfskin coat, given to him by Alaskan furrier and personal friend Jack Kim, which he had been wearing throughout the Summit. Just before he embarked on the airplane, Ford gave his wolfskin coat to Brezhnev, whom he described as "truly overwhelmed" by the gesture. According to Dobrynin, Brezhnev and Ford seemed to have parted as friends. After the Americans waved goodbye, Air Force One taxied to the runway and took off on its multi-hour flight back to the United States.

== Aftermath ==
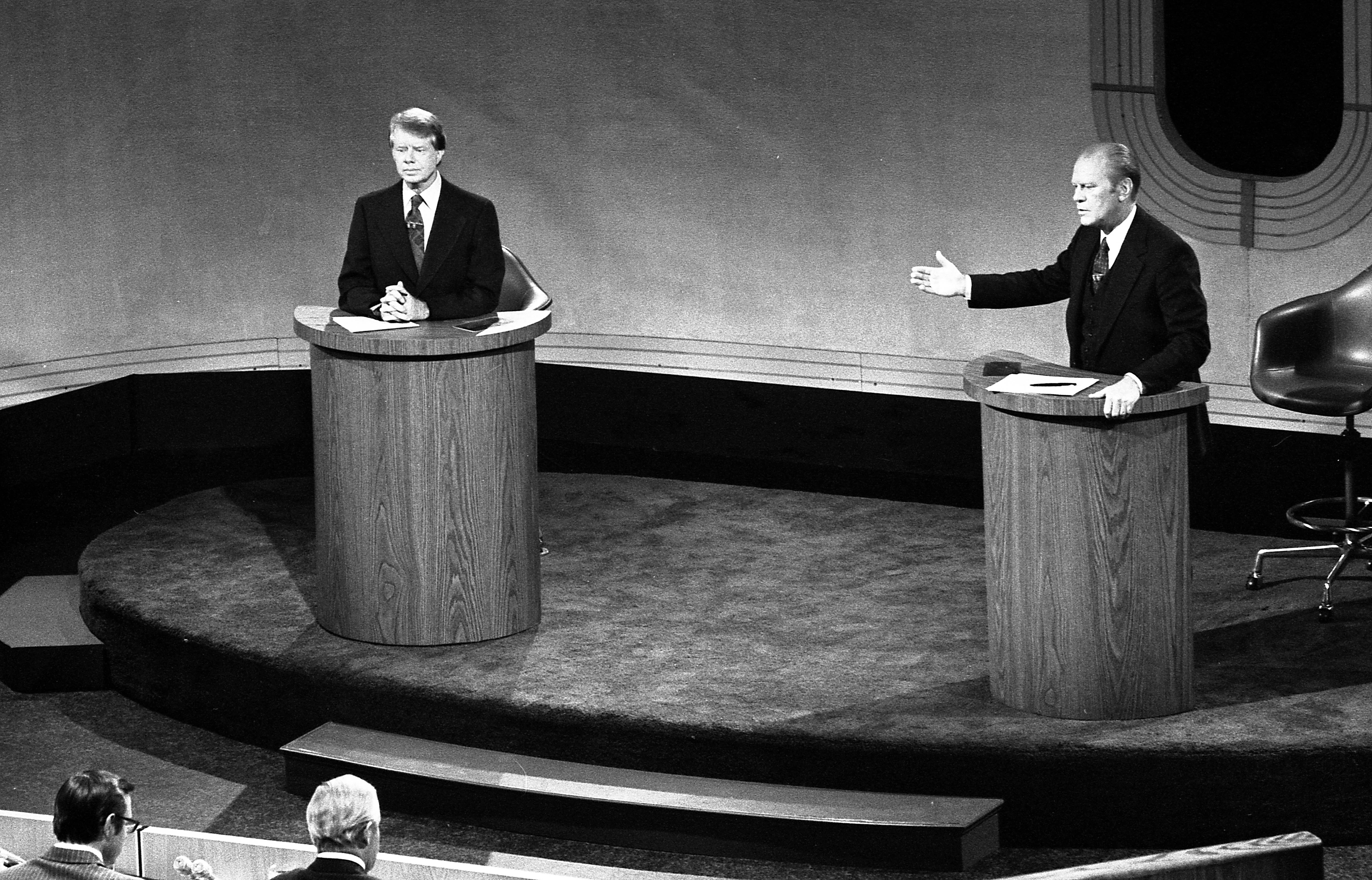
Jimmy Carter and Gerald Ford at the Walnut Street Theatre in Philadelphia during the first of their three presidential debates on September 23, 1976

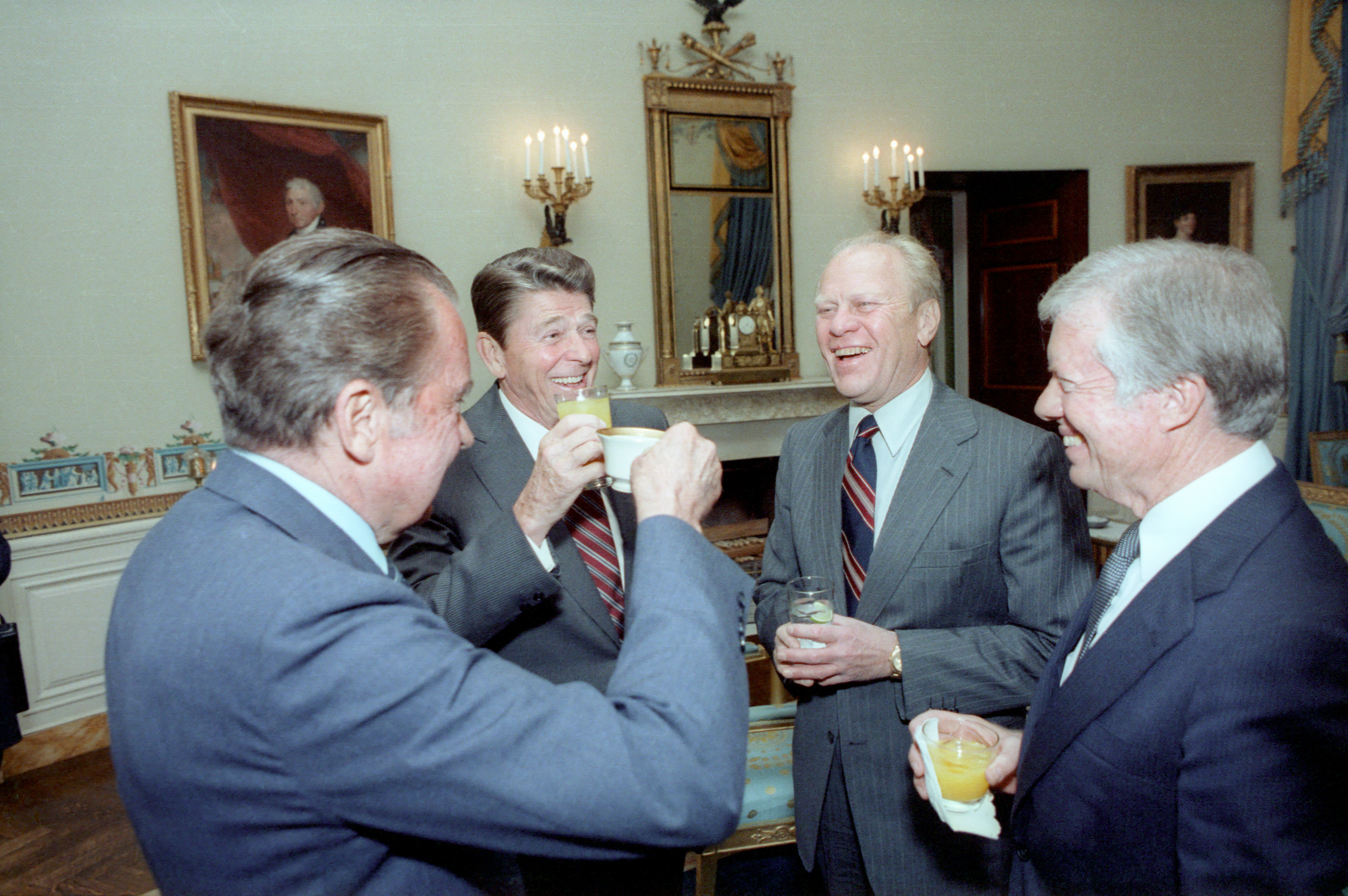
Presidents Nixon, Reagan, Ford, and Carter together in the White House in 1981

In Ford's estimation, the Summit had been a success: he described it as "an appropriate ending to a journey designed to strengthen ties with old friends and expand areas of agreement with potential adversaries" and an experience that "had exceeded my expectations". Kissinger referred to the American delegation as "exuberant" after departing from Vladivostok, and in his view it was "the Soviets who had made almost all the concessions". Dobrynin opined that "both sides were satisfied with the results of the meeting" and even went as far as to call the Vladivostok Summit the high point of détente between the Soviet Union and the United States, claiming that "for that Ford deserves credit as well as Brezhnev".

On December 10, Dobrynin and Kissinger "exchanged confidential memoranda with details of the limitations on strategic arms agreed at Vladivostok", which would go into force in October 1977 and remain in force until December 1985. In Dobrynin's view, the Summit "became a significant starting-point for all subsequent nuclear disarmament talks" and "provided a sense of continuity to the SALT process". Back in the United States, however, Ford came under intense criticism from both the left and the right: many politicians accused him of yielding to Soviet pressure, most notable among them Ronald Reagan. In Kissinger's view, the Ford administration was opposed by many who believed that "agreement with the Soviets was more dangerous than stalemate even after a successful summit". According to him, major American newspapers such as The New York Times and The Washington Post were generally critical of the Summit. Kissinger also noted the changing focus of the opposition to the agreement at Vladivostok, which first emphasized reductions and then stressed "equal throw-weight". Against this opposition, Kissinger lamented that the Ford administration "watched with dismay as the Vladivostok agreement dissolved before our eyes".

As the election year of 1976 began, Ford backed away from the SALT process he had been involved in at Vladivostok in 1974, but according to Dobrynin it was not his stance on arms limitation but rather his pardon of Richard Nixon that ultimately cost him the election. In Dobrynin's opinion, the "euphoria" of détente that had marked the Nixon and Ford years had "faded away", and after the election of Jimmy Carter as President of the United States in 1976 the policy of détente between the Soviet Union and the United States "steadily eroded". According to Kissinger, by the time that Reagan became President in 1981, the only way for the Americans to obtain additional reductions from the Soviets was to "threaten a buildup of our strategic forces". In all, Kissinger believed that the Vladivostok Summit was a failed opportunity to improve relations between the Soviet Union and the United States, and its unraveling was evidence that "the entire SALT process was floundering and might even collapse".

== See also ==
- List of Soviet Union–United States summits (1943 to 1991)
