= Washington Summit (1973) =

Meeting between Leonid Brezhnev and Richard Nixon

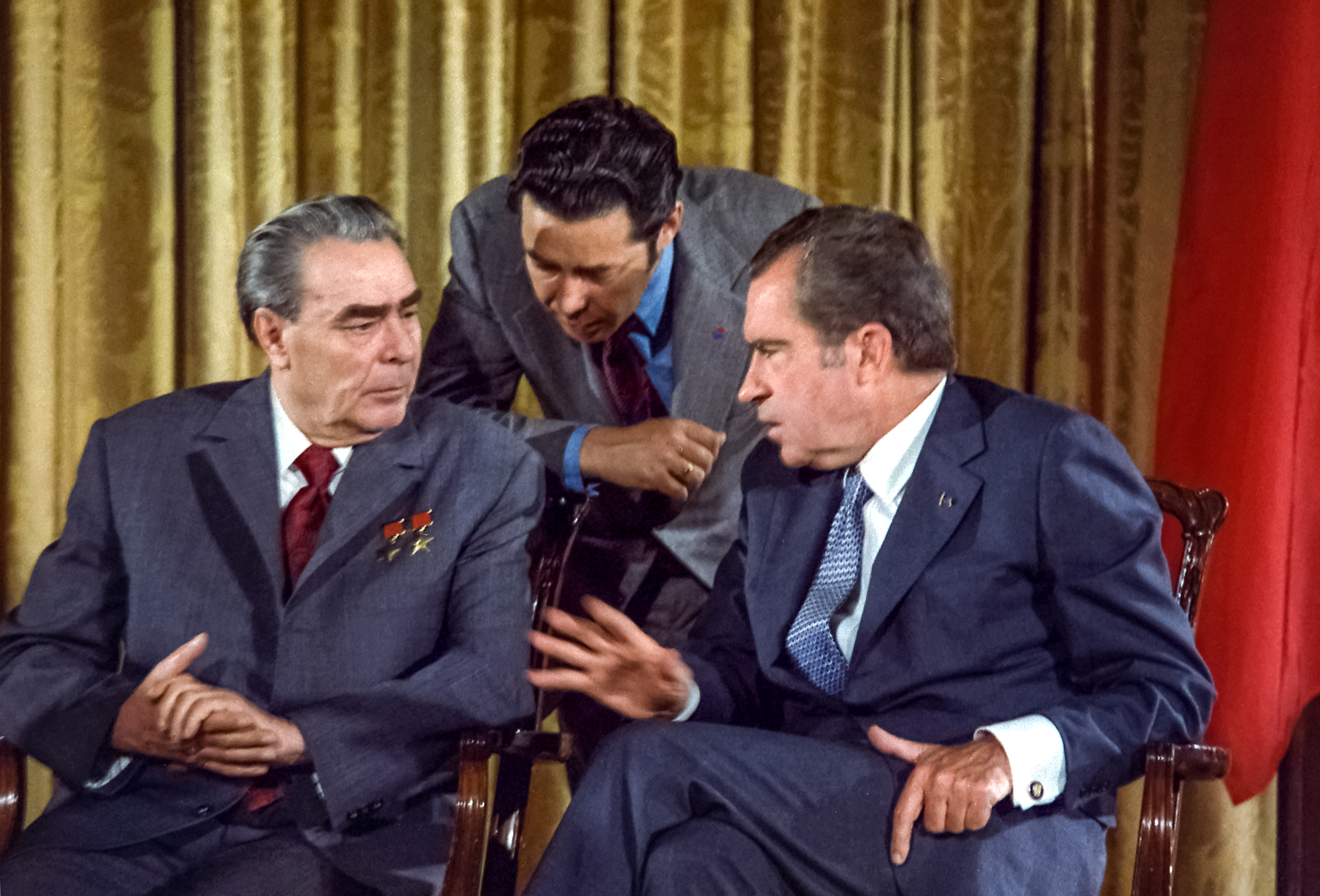
- Host country: United States
- Date: June 18–25, 1973
- Cities: Washington, D.C.
- Venues: White House
- Participants: (Soviet Union) Leonid Brezhnev & Alexei Kosygin (United States) Richard Nixon & Henry Kissinger
- Follows: Moscow Summit (1972)
- Precedes: Moscow Summit (1974)

The Washington Summit of 1973 was a Cold War-era meeting between United States president Richard Nixon, United States secretary of state Henry Kissinger, General Secretary of the Communist Party of the Soviet Union Leonid Brezhnev, and Chairman of the Council of Ministers of the Soviet Union Alexei Kosygin that took place June 18–25. The Cold War superpowers met at the White House to discuss issues regarding oceanography, transportation, agricultural research, cultural exchange, and most significantly, nuclear disarmament. The Agreement on the Prevention of Nuclear War was signed during the summit. The summit has been called a high-water mark in détente between the USSR and the US. The summit was originally intended to run until June 26, but ended a day early.

== Context ==
The Washington Summit meeting occurred during a period within the Cold War era known as détente, which took place between 1967 and 1979. This shift in the historical conflict marked an easing of tensions between the United States of America and the Soviet Union, through which various Summits, including the Washington Summit, were an attempt to strengthen diplomatic relations and limit the possibility of nuclear war. The Washington Summit was preceded by the Geneva Summit (1955) and SALT I (1972) which both raised the international issues of disarmament, international relations and economic ties. These worldwide concerns established the landscape for further discussions at the Summit, which were a direct attempt to prevent further hot spots within the ongoing conflict.

== Mission ==
Upon commencement of the Washington Summit, both US president Richard Nixon and Soviet General Secretary, Leonid Brezhnev had a common motive to agree on a Second Strategic Arms Limitation Treaty. This mutual agreement was proposed to strengthen international security and global peace. The proposed mission would follow on from the prior Moscow Summit and Geneva Summit, which had failed to halt nuclear negotiations and disarmament under a SALT II Treaty.

While the United States of America and the Soviet Union had many shared motives, including the "goals of better relations between our two governments, a better life for our people, the Russian people, the American people, and above all, the goal that goes beyond our two countries, but to the whole world-the goal of lifting the burden of armaments from the world and building a structure of peace", there were diverging and contradictory plans occurring outside of such mission. Both participants continued to plan and develop their nuclear capabilities outside of international law, with Brezhnev pushing for improved Soviet-American relations based on economic gain and a chance to acquire US technology. Brezhnev recognised The Soviet Union's "technological lag" and therefore used improved Soviet-American relations to his advantage. Nixon, along with Henry Alfred Kissinger, the United States secretary of state and national security advisor under his presidency, continued to pursue international domination at the expense of the Soviet Union. Nixon continued to demonise the Soviet Union through international affairs, using conflict in affected nations, such as Vietnam and Japan, to push Soviet influence out by cultivating an international view that events such as the Indo-Pakistani War and Israeli-Palestinian dispute, were a direct result of Communist influence.

Diverging diplomatic opinions arose in regards to "Most Favoured Nation Status", which distracted from the primary mission. While initially, the opposing nations had plans for the US to obtain Most Favoured Nation Status of the Soviet Union, a position which would ensure equal and fair trade agreements, improving exports, tariffs and commercial agreements, national opposition weakened this mission. A congressional coalition had formed on the basis of opposing this advancement in the relations, rejecting the foundations of détente, which restricted movement by Nixon. Led by Senator Henry "Scoop" Jackson over the issue of emigration of Soviet Jews, they along with American Jewish lobby groups had sought to deny that status to the Soviet Union. Frustrated at such efforts, Nixon accused these groups of putting the "Jewish interest above America's interest" and threatened to blame them publicly if they "torpedoed" the summit.

Meanwhile, Brezhnev was "enthusiastic" about the establishment of Most Favoured Nation Status based on the economic benefits and was therefore disappointed in the withdrawn agreements.

== Participants ==
The Summit only directly involved the United States of America and the Soviet Union, with President Richard Nixon and his secretary of state, Henry Kissinger, along with Soviet General Secretary Leonid Brezhnev meeting exclusively in the White House. The mission of the discussions, as well as the international concern of relations included neighbouring and wider nations. The nations involved in discussion included South Vietnam, Viet Cong, North Vietnam, wider Europe and the Middle East. These countries were involved through Cold War related conflicts, such as the Indo-Pakistani War and Israeli-Palestinian dispute as well as trade agreements, and Peace Treaties, such as the Paris Peace Accord.

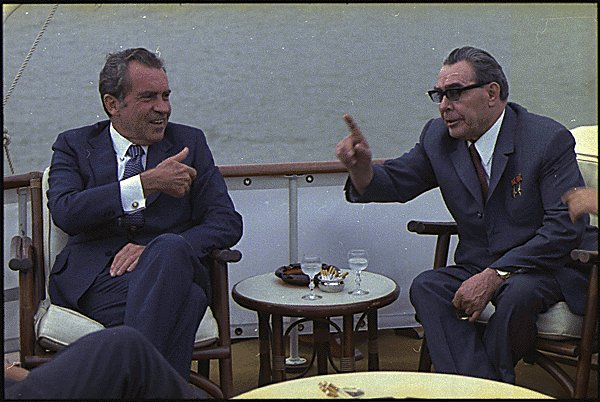
Nixon and Brezhnev aboard the USS Sequoia, June 19th 1973.

As founded in the principles of détente, the two leaders strived to improve diplomatic relations, which then extended in to their own personal relationship and personalities throughout the Summit. All meetings between the two superpower leaders were recorded through a taping system within the White House. The release of these tapes revealed casual and friendly exchanges between Nixon and Brezhnev, with the men establishing a strong personal relationship to "facilitate successful resolutions of various issues." When Brezhnev arrived to the White House in Washington, Nixon had gifted him a Lincoln Continental, a luxury car produced by the car-brand Lincoln. During Brezhnev's visit to the US, he stayed at Nixon's estate La Casa Pacifica, also known as the "Western White House". Throughout the meetings, many personal affairs were also discussed, including both the leader's children, wives and jokes made regarding cigarettes and the weather being a "good omen", according to Brezhnev. The superpowers participated in casual meetings, such as their working dinner aboard the presidential yacht, USS Sequoia.

=== Indochina ===
International issues regarding conflict and restoring peace in Vietnam, Cambodia and wider Indochina were of discussion within the Summit, reaching a conclusion that these nations should govern free from the interference of either superpower nation. Both Brezhnev and Nixon affirmed each other's support for the process of restoring peace in Vietnam after ending the war, agreeing on the mutual benefit of this treaty and its ability to ensure peace based on a common recognition of the independence, unity and increasing territorial integrity of the wider region. Cambodia was another topic of the Summit, emphasising the importance of ending military action.

=== Europe ===
Relations with and within Europe were discussed by the US and USSR, specifically within France and Germany, which contributed to international stability. Throughout the Summit, both superpowers agreed on the importance of strengthening relations within Europe, reaffirming past agreements such as the Quadripartite Agreement on 1971 and 1972 with Germany and France. The Summit allowed the leaders to discuss the Joint Communique between the nations that allowed both joint and separate efforts to strengthen international relations. The discussion led to a conclusion that in order for peace and stability, military action within Central Europe would have to cease, negotiating the reduction of forces and weaponry, which was proposed to begin on October 30, 1973.

=== Middle East ===
The Middle East, as a hot point for Cold War action, was of discussion throughout the Washington Summit. Both superpowers were aware of the danger that war may break out between Arab states under Egypt and Syria, against Israel. Negotiations in this region were founded on the need for "principles" which would aid in bringing peace, with Brezhnev stating "we must put this warlike situation to an end". One solution to this international issue discussed in the Summit was the guaranteed withdrawal of Israel from Arab territories, assuring independence and stability in neighbouring regions. Both superpowers recognised their alliances with involved nations, specifically the USSR with Egypt, but put these aside to discuss the "legitimate interests of the Palestinian people". Negotiations regarding the Middle East were unsuccessful as the Yom Kippur War broke out on 6 October 1973 between the nations that Nixon and Brezhnev had discussed.

== Discussions ==
Various agreements were discussed and negotiated, regarding both international and domestic relations, trade and exchange, conflict and environmental issues throughout the Summit.

=== Relations ===
A point of discussion within the Summit was the improvement on International Security, which aimed to promote peaceful international relations as well as end Cold War related "proxy wars". The superpowers discussed the need for a security conference regarding relations in Europe as well as the expansion of Soviet influence in Western Europe and strengthened influence in Eastern Europe. Brezhnev believed this would solve the issue of freedom of communication between the two regions. However, no movement on this matter was taken after negotiation. They further discussed the nature of their relationship with the Middle East, agreeing on the need to avoid direct conflict with this region. A negotiation regarding "crisis management" was proposed in regard to conflict in the Middle East, with Brezhnev stressing the need for the US to urge Israel to vacate Arab territories. With the Paris Peace Accord occurring just 6 months prior to the Summit meeting, both superpowers affirmed the continuation of cease-fire.

=== Culture and economy ===
Cultural, economic and environmental negotiations also took place during the Summit meeting, as executive agreements were signed regarding oceanography, transportation, agricultural research and cultural exchange. The superpowers emphasised cooperation in agricultural research and technology, agreeing on the mutually beneficial exchange of research on agricultural estimates and forecasting in production, consumption and demand, plant science, including genetics, breeding, plant protection and crop production, livestock and poultry science, soil science, mechanisation, processing and preservation and an exchange of scientists and specialists. An agreement was also made on cooperation in studies of oceanography, combining knowledge of the ocean through an equal exchange of work in chemistry, geology, ocean-atmosphere interaction and biology. Agreements on transportation took place to mutually benefit the environments of both the Soviet Union and the US, sharing practical knowledge of bridge and construction, railway, aviation, marine and automobile transport, safety and traffic. Cultural exchange was a major factor of negotiation within the Summit, with an agreement that scientific, technical, educational and cultural exchange would promote equal relations.

The economic agreements discussed throughout the Summit extended into monetary trade agreements which were proposed to support and grow the economies of both nations and strengthen relations on all spheres. Nixon and Brezhnev agreed on the aim of trading 3 billion dollars’ worth of goods and services over a three-year period under a Joint US-USSR Commercial Commission. The nations proposed an expansion of contacts between economic, financial and commercial institutions. The cooperation of services and economic projects was done through the disclosure of current projects. The USA informed the USSR of the current delivery of natural gas from Siberia. A negotiation of projects that would benefit both sides of the conflict was agreed on.

=== Taxation ===
Economic and commercial agreements throughout the Washington Summit extended into discussion regarding taxation. The USA and USSR signed an agreement which would eliminate double taxation on all types of income. This agreement ensured citizens would only be involved in the tax system of their Contracting State. This declaration applied to income from artistic, literary and scientific works, income from sales of property, income from the sales of goods and services, interest on credit loans and direct inheritance.

=== Prevention of Nuclear War ===
The Washington Summit focused on the Agreement on the Prevention of Nuclear War between the two superpowers. Both the Soviet Union and the USA recognised the dangers of nuclear war which had neared throughout the Cold War, and agreed that restrictions were to be put in place to limit and eliminate this occurrence. This agreement occurred on June 22, 1973, in which they mutually agreed to remove danger of nuclear war through avoiding direct military conflict and partaking in urgent consultation if the occurrence arises. This treaty was signed for an unlimited duration and proposed strengthened international security on a large scale.

== Concluding events ==
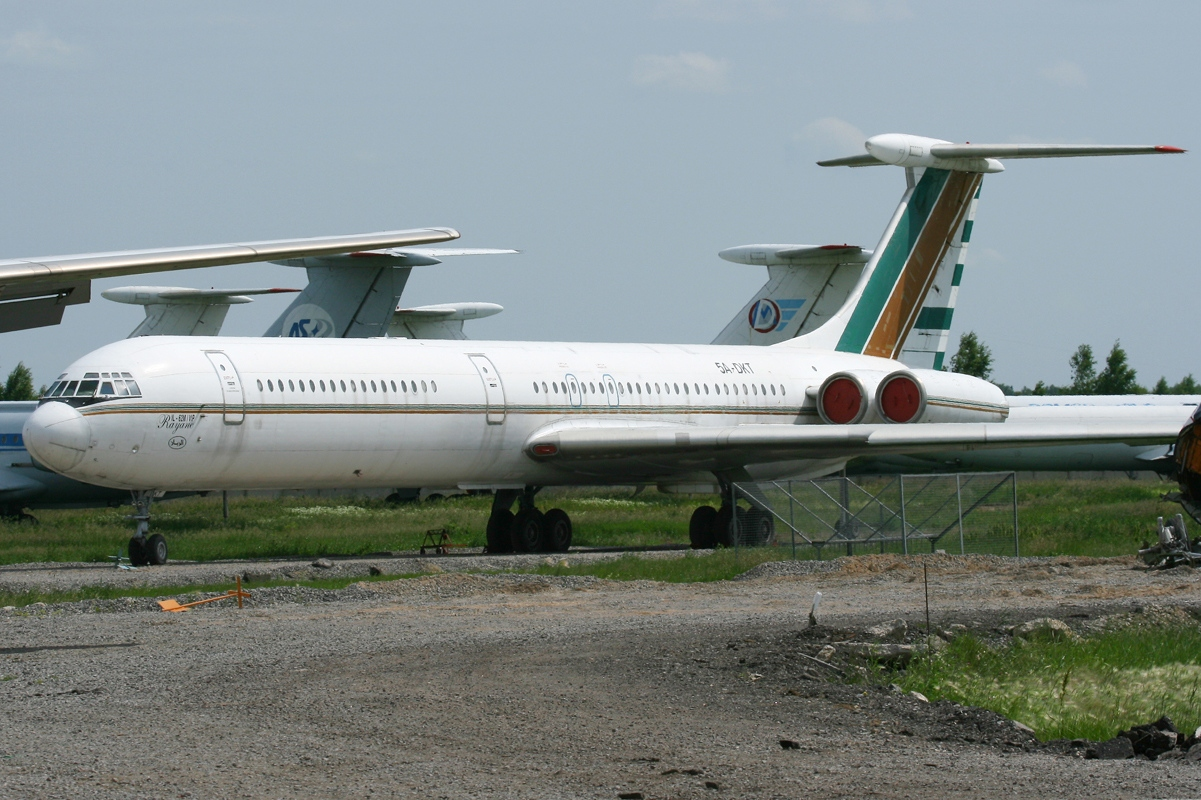
Soviet Aircraft, Ilyushin-62 jetliner which Brezhnev travelled in.

On the concluding day of the Summit, June 24, 1973, both superpowers declared their work as a "landmark for the post war era". On his final night, Brezhnev became the first Russian leader to appear on television within the US, speaking directly to the population in a 47 minute long segment on his personal delight with the outcomes of the Summit and for the future of the world. Brezhnev apologised for the visit being of high security and promised that in the future he would meet US citizens and see more of the country. He mentioned a desire to visit New York, Chicago, Detroit and Los Angeles in order to see firsthand, the industrial projects and farms which were of discussion, and to interact with American working people. He proposed a possible meeting in the next six to eight months to the president.

Finishing a day early, Brezhnev departed from the US on June 25, 1973, leaving from Andrews Air Force Base to Paris, where he would meet with President Pompidou. As his four-engine Ilyushin-62 jetliner took off, a marching band, gun salute and honour guard waved him off. No ordinary US citizens were permitted to attend except Air Force personnel and their families.
