= Strategic Arms Limitation Talks =

Two conferences between the United States and Soviet Union involving arms control

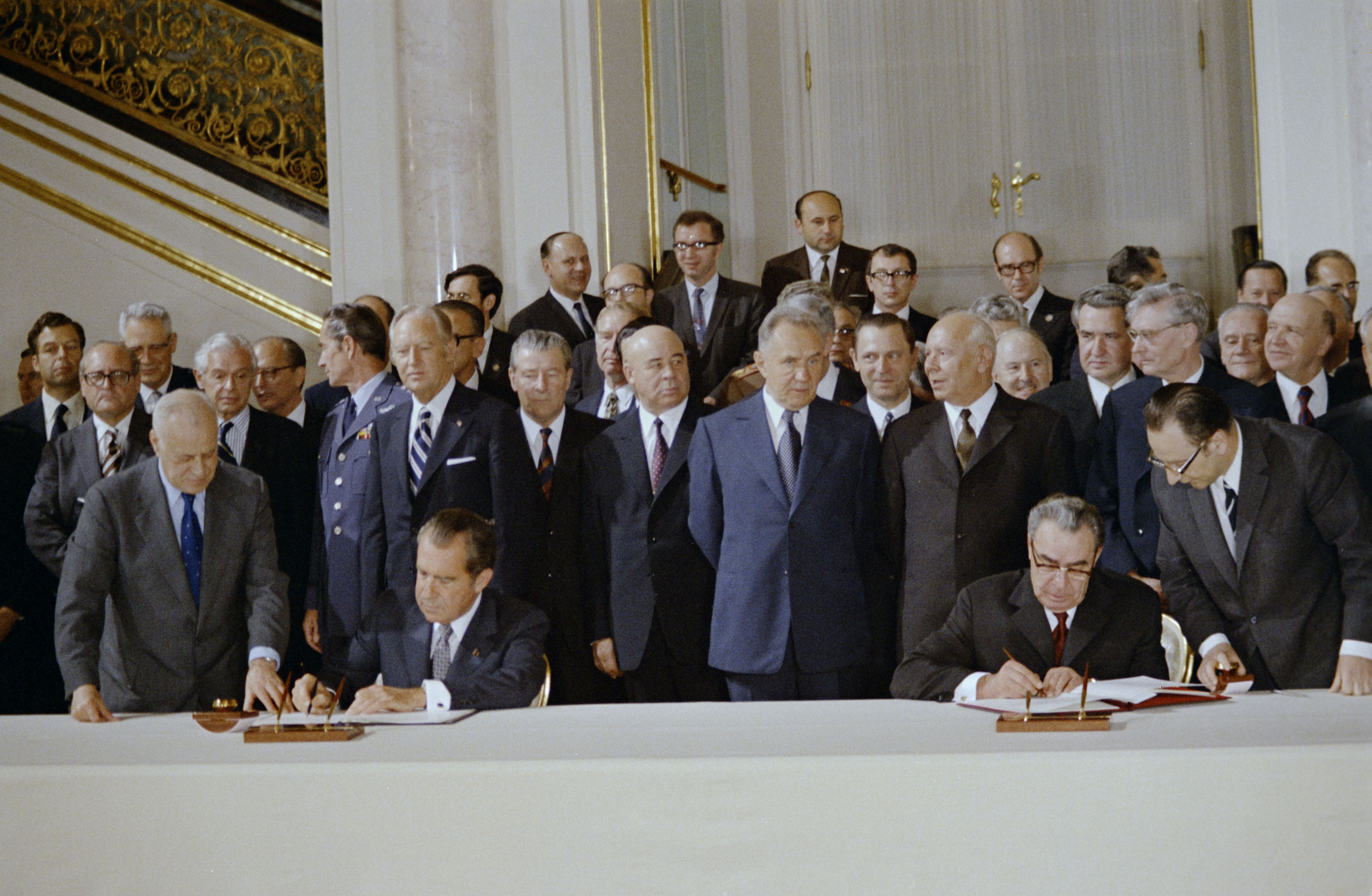
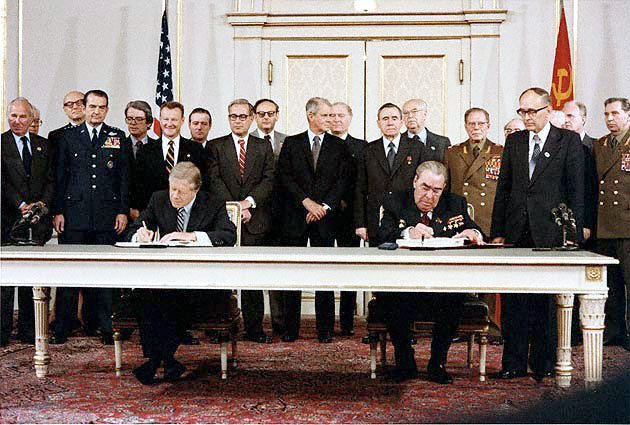
- May 26, 1972. President Nixon and General Secretary Brezhnev signing the (SALT 1) ABM Treaty (Limitation of Anti-Ballistic Missile Systems) President Jimmy Carter and Soviet General Secretary Leonid Brezhnev sign the Strategic Arms Limitation Talks (SALT II) treaty, June 18, 1979, in Vienna.
- Type: Strategic nuclear disarmament
- Replaced by: START I
- Signatories: SALT I: (United States) Richard Nixon: (Soviet Union) Leonid Brezhnev; SALT II: (United States) Jimmy Carter (Soviet Union) Leonid Brezhnev
- Parties: United States; Soviet Union

The Strategic Arms Limitation Talks (SALT) were two rounds of bilateral conferences and corresponding international treaties involving the United States and the Soviet Union. The Cold War superpowers dealt with arms control in two rounds of talks and agreements: SALT I and SALT II.

Negotiations commenced in Helsinki, in November 1969. SALT I led to the Anti-Ballistic Missile Treaty and an interim agreement between the two countries.

Although SALT II resulted in an agreement in 1979 in Vienna, in response to the 1980 Soviet invasion of Afghanistan the US Senate chose not to ratify the treaty. The Supreme Soviet did not ratify it either. The agreement expired on December 31, 1985, and was not renewed, although both sides continued to respect it.

The talks led to the STARTs, or Strategic Arms Reduction Treaties, which consisted of START I, a 1991 completed agreement between the United States and the Soviet Union, and START II, a 1993 agreement between the United States and Russia which never entered into effect, both of which proposed limits on multiple-warhead capacities and other restrictions on each side's number of nuclear weapons. A successor to START I, New START, was proposed and was eventually ratified in February 2011.

== SALT I Treaty ==
SALT I is the common name for the Strategic Arms Limitation Talks Agreement signed on May 26, 1972. SALT I froze the number of strategic ballistic missile launchers at existing levels and provided for the addition of new submarine-launched ballistic missile (SLBM) launchers only after the same number of older intercontinental ballistic missile (ICBM) and SLBM launchers had been dismantled. SALT I also limited land-based ICBMs that were in range from the northeastern border of the Continental United States to the northwestern border of the continental Soviet Union. In addition, SALT I limited the number of SLBM capable submarines that NATO and the United States could operate to 50 with a maximum of 800 SLBM launchers between them. If the United States or NATO were to increase that number, the Soviets could respond with increasing their arsenal by the same amount.

The strategic nuclear forces of the Soviet Union and the United States were changing in character in 1968. The total number of missiles held by the United States had been static since 1967 at 1,054 ICBMs and 656 SLBMs but there was an increasing number of missiles with multiple independently targetable reentry vehicle (MIRV) warheads being deployed. MIRVs carried multiple nuclear warheads, often with dummies, to confuse ABM systems, making MIRV defense by ABM systems increasingly difficult and expensive. Both sides were also permitted to increase their number of SLBM forces but only if they disassembled an equivalent number of older ICBMs or SLBM launchers on older submarines.

One of the terms of the treaty required both countries to limit the number of deployment sites protected by an anti-ballistic missile (ABM) system to one each. The idea of that system was to prevent a competition in ABM deployment between the United States and the Soviet Union. The Soviet Union had deployed such a system around Moscow in 1966, and the United States announced an ABM program to protect twelve ICBM sites in 1967. After 1968, the Soviets tested a system for the SS-9 missile, otherwise known as the R-36 missile. A modified two-tier Moscow ABM system is still used. The United States built only one ABM site to protect a Minuteman base in North Dakota where the "Safeguard" Program was deployed. That base was increasingly more vulnerable to attacks by the Soviet ICBMs because of the advancement in Soviet missile technology.

Negotiations lasted from November 17, 1969, to May 26, 1972, in a series of meetings beginning in Helsinki, with the American delegation headed by Gerard C. Smith, director of the Arms Control and Disarmament Agency. Subsequent sessions alternated between Vienna and Helsinki. McNamara played a significant role with working to reduce the arms race between the U.S. and Soviet Union. There were two distinct ways in which he worked to govern the nuclear threat. First, he thought there was a need to avoid the deployment of an ABM system from both countries. To do this, the second thing he believed was the only way to limit the tension was to have many negotiations and discussion about deterrence, holding each other responsible for keeping peace through full communication. One problem that he ran into was that limitation strategies weren't working and open to full of critiques, and the U.S. alongside Soviet continued to make new ballistic missiles. The US nuclear arsenals was far too large at that point in history to even pose for arms limitation at that point. After a long deadlock, the first results of SALT I came in May 1971, when an agreement was reached over ABM systems. Further discussion brought the negotiations to an end in Moscow in 1972, when U.S. President Richard Nixon and Soviet General Secretary Leonid Brezhnev signed both the Anti-Ballistic Missile Treaty and the Interim Agreement Between the United States of America and the Union of Soviet Socialist Republics on Certain Measures With Respect to the Limitation of Strategic Offensive Arms.

The two sides also agreed to a number of basic principles regarding appropriate conduct. Each recognized the sovereignty of the other; agreed to the principle of noninterference; and sought to promote economic, scientific, and cultural ties of mutual benefit and enrichment.

Nixon was proud that his diplomatic skills made him achieve an agreement that his predecessors had been unable to reach. Nixon and Kissinger planned to link arms control to détente and to the resolution of other urgent problems through what Nixon called "linkage". David Tal argues:

The linkage between strategic arms limitations and outstanding issues such as the Middle East, Berlin and, foremost, Vietnam thus became central to Nixon's and Kissinger's policy of détente. Through employment of linkage, they hoped to change the nature and course of U.S. foreign policy, including U.S. nuclear disarmament and arms control policy, and to separate them from those practiced by Nixon's predecessors. They also intended, through linkage, to make U.S. arms control policy part of détente. [...] His policy of linkage had in fact failed. It failed mainly because it was based on flawed assumptions and false premises, the foremost of which was that the Soviet Union wanted strategic arms limitation agreement much more than the United States did.

The agreement paved the way for further discussion regarding international cooperation and a limitation of nuclear armaments, as seen through both the SALT II Treaty and the Washington Summit of 1973.

== SALT II Treaty ==
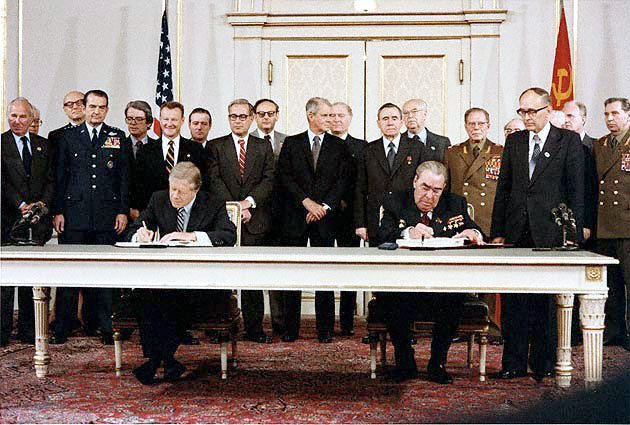
Jimmy Carter and Leonid Brezhnev signing the SALT II treaty, June 18, 1979, at the Hofburg Palace, in Vienna

SALT II was a series of talks between American and Soviet negotiators from 1972 to 1979 that sought to curtail the manufacture of strategic nuclear weapons. It was a continuation of the SALT I talks and was led by representatives from both countries. It was the first nuclear arms treaty to assume real reductions in strategic forces to 2,250 of all categories of delivery vehicles on both sides.

The SALT II Treaty banned new missile programs, defined as those with any key parameter 5% better than in currently-employed missiles. That forced both sides to limit their new strategic missile types development and construction, such as the development of additional fixed ICBM launchers. Likewise, the agreement would limit the number of MIRVed ballistic missiles and long range missiles to 1,320. However, the United States preserved its most essential programs like the Trident missile, along with the cruise missiles President Jimmy Carter wished to use as his main defensive weapon as they were too slow to have first strike capability. In return, the Soviets could exclusively retain 308 of its so-called "heavy ICBM" launchers of the SS-18 type.

A major breakthrough for the agreement occurred at the Vladivostok Summit Meeting in November 1974, when President Gerald Ford and General Secretary Leonid Brezhnev came to an agreement on the basic framework for the SALT II agreement. The elements of the agreement were stated to be in effect until 1985.

An agreement to limit strategic launchers was reached in Vienna on June 18, 1979, and was signed by Brezhnev and Carter at a ceremony held in the Redoutensaal of the Hofburg Palace.

Six months after the signing, the Soviets invaded Afghanistan, and in September, the United States discovered that a Soviet combat brigade was stationed in Cuba. Although Carter claimed that the Soviet brigade had been deployed to Cuba only recently, the unit had been stationed on the island since the Cuban Missile Crisis of 1962. In light of those developments, Carter withdrew the treaty from consideration in January 1980, and the US Senate never consented to ratification although terms were honored by both sides until 1986.

SALT II was superseded by START I in 1991.

== See also ==
- Comprehensive Test Ban Treaty
- Intermediate-Range Nuclear Forces Treaty
- Nuclear Non-Proliferation Treaty
- START
- New START
- Threshold Test Ban Treaty

== General and cited sources ==
- Ambrose, Matthew, The Control Agenda: A History of the Strategic Arms Limitation Talks (Ithaca, New York: Cornell University Press, 2018). The Control Agenda: A History of the Strategic Arms Limitation Talks
- Burr, William (ed.), The Secret History of The ABM Treaty, 1969-1972, National Security Archive Electronic Briefing Book No. 60, The National Security Archive, George Washington University, Washington, D.C., 8 November 2001, The Secret History of The ABM Treaty
- Calvo-Goller Karin and Calvo Michel, The SALT AGREEMENTS: Content, Application, Verification, Brill, 1987, 428 p, at Google Books
- Clearwater, John Murray, Johnson, McNamara, and the Birth of SALT and the ABM Treaty, 1963-1969 (Dissertation.Com, 1999) ISBN 978-1581120622
- Garthoff, Raymond L., "Negotiating SALT," Wilson Quarterly, vol. 1, no. 5, Autumn 1977, pp. 76–85, JSTOR 40255284
- Garthoff, Raymond L., Détente and Confrontation: American-Soviet Relations from Nixon to Reagan, 2nd ed. (Washington, D.C.: The Brookings Institution, 1994), esp. pgs. 146–223
- Haslam, Jonathan and Theresa Osborne, SALT I: The Limitations of Arms Negotiations. U.S.-Soviet Talks Leading to the Interim Agreement on the Limitation of Strategic Offensive Arms, 1969-1972, Pew Case Studies in International Affairs, Institute for the Study of Diplomacy, Georgetown University, Washington, D.C., 1987
- Mahan, Erin R. and Edward C. Keefer (eds.), Foreign Relations of the United States, 1969–1976, Volume XXXII, SALT I, 1969–1972 (Washington, D.C.: U.S. Government Printing Office, 2010),
- Newhouse, John, Cold Dawn: The Story of SALT (Holt, Rinehart and Winston, 1973)
- Payne, Samuel B. The Soviet Union and SALT (Cambridge, Massachusetts: MIT Press, 1980)
- Savel'yev, Alexander' G. and Nikolay N. Detinov, The Big Five: Arms Control Decision-Making in the Soviet Union (Westport, Conn.: Praeger, 1995)
- Smart, Ian. "The Strategic Arms Limitation Talks." The World Today, vol. 26, no. 7, 1970, pp. 296–305. JSTOR 40394395
- Smith, Gerard C., Doubletalk: The Story of SALT I by the Chief American Negotiator (New York: Doubleday, 1980)
- Smith, Gerard C., Disarming Diplomat: The Memoirs of Ambassador Gerard C. Smith, Arms Control Negotiator (Toronto, Ontario: Madison Books, 1996)
- Tal, David. " 'Absolutes' and 'Stages' in the Making and Application of Nixon's SALT Policy." Diplomatic History 37.5 (2013): 1090–1116.
- Tal, David, US Strategic Arms Policy in the Cold War: Negotiation and Confrontation over SALT, 1969-1979 (New York: Routledge, 2017).
- Talbott, Strobe, Endgame: The Inside Story of Salt II (New York: Harpercollins, 1979) online
