= Richard Rhodes =

American author and historian

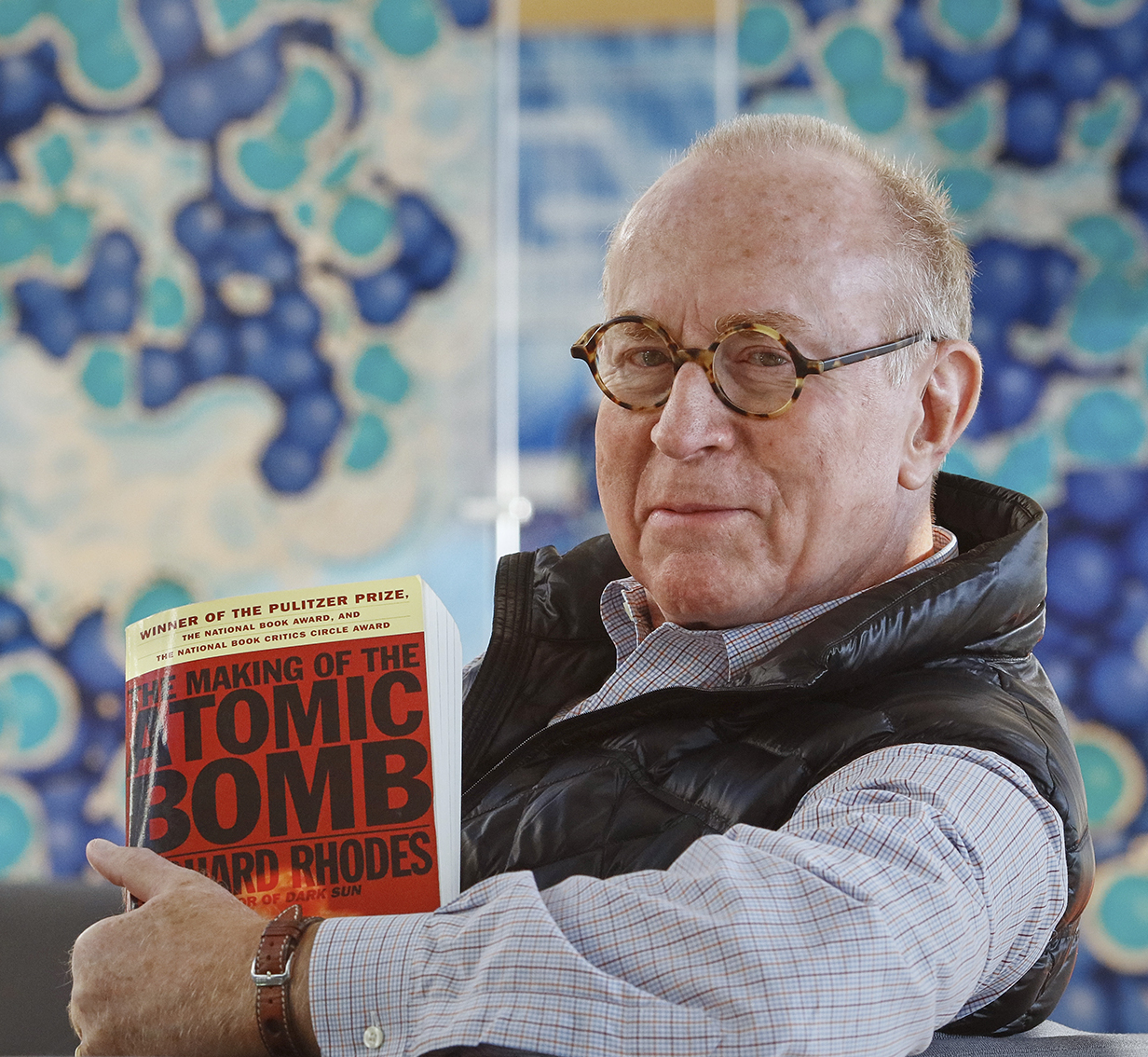
- Rhodes in 2015
- Born: July 4, 1937 (age 89); Kansas City, Kansas, U.S.
- Education: Yale University (BA)
- Occupations: Writer, historian
- Spouse: Ginger Rhodes
- Writing career
- Period: 1970–present
- Notable work: The Making of the Atomic Bomb (1986)
- Notable awards: Pulitzer Prize
- Website: richardrhodes.net

Richard Lee Rhodes (born July 4, 1937) is an American historian, journalist, and author of both fiction and nonfiction, best known for the Pulitzer Prize-winning The Making of the Atomic Bomb (1986).

Rhodes has been awarded grants from the Ford Foundation, the Guggenheim Foundation, the MacArthur Foundation, and the Alfred P. Sloan Foundation among others. Rhodes is an affiliate of the Center for International Security and Cooperation at Stanford University. He also frequently gives lectures and talks on a broad range of subjects, including testimony to the U.S. Senate on nuclear energy.

== Biography ==
Richard Rhodes was born in Kansas City, Kansas, in 1937. Following his mother's suicide on July 25, 1938, Rhodes and his older brother Stanley were raised in the Kansas City, Missouri, area by his father, a railroad boilermaker with a third-grade education. When Rhodes was ten, their father remarried. The new wife starved, exploited, and abused the children. One day Stanley walked into a police station and reported their living conditions.

The brothers were removed from their father's custody and sent to the Andrew Drumm Institute, an institution for boys founded in 1928 in Independence, Missouri. The admission of the brothers was something of an anomaly as the institution was designed for orphaned or indigent boys and they fit neither category. The Drumm Institute is still in operation today, and now accepts both boys and girls. Rhodes became a member of the board of trustees in 1991. Rhodes wrote about his childhood in A Hole in the World.

Richard and Stanley lived at Drumm for the remainder of their adolescence. Both graduated from high school. Rhodes was admitted to Yale University with a full scholarship and graduated with honors in 1959, a member of Manuscript Society.

Rhodes has published 23 books as well as numerous articles for national magazines, and wrote a play that is based on the historic 1986 meeting between Ronald Reagan and Mikhail Gorbachev. His best-known work, The Making of the Atomic Bomb, was published in 1986 and earned him the Pulitzer Prize and numerous other awards. Many of his personal documents and research materials are part of the Kansas Collection at the Spencer Research Library, University of Kansas.

Rhodes is the father of two children and is a grandfather. He and his second wife, Ginger Rhodes, have made their home in California.

== Nuclear history ==
Rhodes came to national prominence with his 1986 book, The Making of the Atomic Bomb, a narrative of the history of the people and events during World War II from the discoveries leading to the science of nuclear fission in the 1930s, through the Manhattan Project and the atomic bombings of Hiroshima and Nagasaki. Among its many honors, the 900-page book won the Pulitzer Prize for General Nonfiction, the National Book Award for Nonfiction, and a National Book Critics Circle Award, and has sold hundreds of thousands of copies in English alone, as well as having been translated into a dozen or so other languages.

Praised by both historians and former Los Alamos weapon engineers and scientists alike, the book is considered a general authority on early nuclear weapons history, as well as the development of modern physics in general, during the first half of the 20th century. According to a citation on the first page of the book, Nobel Laureate Isidor Rabi, one of the prime participants in the dawn of the atomic age, said about the book, "An epic worthy of Milton. Nowhere else have I seen the whole story put down with such elegance and gusto and in such revealing detail and simple language which carries the reader through wonderful and profound scientific discoveries and their application". In 2012 the book was reissued as a 25th anniversary edition with a new foreword by Rhodes.

External videos
- Presentation by Rhodes on Arsenals of Folly, November 1, 2007, C-SPAN
- Presentation by Rhodes on The Twilight of the Bombs, October 21, 2010, C-SPAN
- Presentation by Rhodes on Energy: A Human History, June 2, 2018, C-SPAN

In 1997 Rhodes appeared in the UK Channel 4 TV series Equinox episode "A Very British Bomb" about the UK's efforts after the war to develop its own nuclear weapons after collaboration with the US had been halted by the 1946 MacMahon Act.

Rhodes continued The Making of the Atomic Bomb with three more books on nuclear history; Nicholas Thompson calls it his "four-volume epic".

In 1995 Rhodes published Dark Sun: The Making of the Hydrogen Bomb, which told the story of the atomic espionage during World War II, the debates over whether the hydrogen bomb ought to be produced, and the eventual creation of the bomb and its consequences for the arms race. Dark Sun received a positive review from the physicist Hans Bethe, who participated in the Manhattan Project. In 2007, Rhodes continued the series with the Arsenals of Folly: The Making of the Nuclear Arms Race, a chronicle of the arms buildups during the Cold War, especially focusing on Mikhail Gorbachev and the Reagan administration. The Twilight of the Bombs, the final volume, was published in 2010. The book documents the post–Cold War nuclear history of the world, nuclear proliferation, and nuclear terrorism.

In 1992, Rhodes edited and wrote the introduction to an annotated version of The Los Alamos Primer, written by Manhattan Project scientist Robert Serber. The Primer was a set of lectures given to new arrivals at the secret Los Alamos Laboratory during wartime to get them up to speed about the prominent questions needing to be solved in bomb design, and had been largely declassified in 1965, but was not widely available. In 1994, he published Nuclear Renewal: Common Sense about Energy detailing the history of the nuclear power industry in the United States, and future promises of nuclear power.

== Other works ==
Rhodes's 1997 book Deadly Feasts is a work of verity (Rhodes' preferred name for nonfiction) concerning transmissible spongiform encephalopathies (TSE), prions, and the career of Daniel Carleton Gajdusek. It reviews the history of TSE epidemics, beginning with the infection of large numbers of the Fore people of the New Guinea Eastern Highlands during a period when they consumed their dead in mortuary feasts, and explores the link between new variant Creutzfeldt–Jakob disease (nvCJD) in humans and the consumption of beef contaminated with bovine spongiform encephalopathy, commonly referred to as mad cow disease.

External videos
- Presentation by Rhodes on John James Audubon: The Making of an American, December 1, 2004, C-SPAN
- Interview with Rhodes on Audubon, June 4, 2006, C-SPAN
- Presentation by Rhodes on Hell and Good Company: The Spanish Civil War and the World It Made, February 10, 2015, C-SPAN

Rhodes's 1999 book Why They Kill: The Discoveries of a Maverick Criminologist discusses the life and violentization theory of Lonnie Athens and was adapted into the documentary film, Why They Kill (2017), written and directed by Giuseppe M. Fazari. His 1990 memoir A Hole in the World: An American Boyhood was adapted into the documentary film Hole in My World (2026), written by Giuseppe M. Fazari and directed by Fazari and Alex Agisilaou.

John James Audubon, published in 2004, is a biography of the French-born American artist, John James Audubon (1785–1851). Audubon is known for his life-sized watercolor illustrations of birds and wildlife, including The Birds of America, a multi-volume work published through subscriptions in the mid-19th century, first in England and then in the United States. Rhodes also edited a collection of Audubon's letters and writings—The Audubon Reader, published by Everyman's Library (Alfred A. Knopf, 2006).

Hedy's Folly was published in November 2011 and deals with the life and work of the Hollywood actress and inventor Hedy Lamarr.

Rhodes's book Hell and Good Company, published in 2015, is about the Spanish Civil War and the changes that came from it.

Rhodes's 2018 book, Energy: A Human History, reviews the history of our use of energy from around 1500 to the present. Steven Novella writes for the Science-Based Medicine that "it is well-researched and contains a wealth of historical information ... A few themes stuck out for me in the book. One was how similar the social, political, and market forces are today and in the past when it comes to energy" and "the book is timely because the history of our energy decisions in the past is great background for our energy decisions today from his 2018 review."

Though less well known as a writer of fiction, Rhodes is also the author of four novels. Three of the four went out of print, but The Ungodly: A Novel of the Donner Party, his first, was reissued in a new edition in 2007 by Stanford University Press.

== Works ==
External videos
- Booknotes interview with Rhodes on Farm: A Year in the Life of an American Farmer, December 24, 1989, C-SPAN

- — (1970). The Inland Ground: An Evocation of the American Middle West. illus. Bill Greer. New York: Atheneum. ISBN 0-333-12851-6.
- — (1973). The Ungodly: A Novel of the Donner Party. New York: Charterhouse. ISBN 9780333128398. OCLC 919530767.
- — (1974). The Ozarks. New York: Time-Life. ISBN 0-8094-1196-2.
- — (1978). Holy Secrets. Garden City, NY: Doubleday. ISBN 0-385-02565-3.
- — (1979). Looking for America: A Writer's Odyssey. Garden City, NY: Doubleday. ISBN 0-385-14473-3.
- — (1980). The Last Safari. Garden City, NY: Doubleday. ISBN 0-385-14243-9.
- — (1981). Sons of Earth. New York: Coward, McCann & Geoghegan. ISBN 0-698-11055-2.
- — (1986). The Making of the Atomic Bomb. New York: Simon & Schuster. ISBN 0-671-44133-7.
- — (1989). Farm: A Year in the Life of an American Farmer. New York: Simon & Schuster. ISBN 0-671-63647-2.
- — (1990). A Hole in the World: An American Boyhood. New York: Simon & Schuster. ISBN 0-671-69066-3.
- — (1991). The Inland Ground: An Evocation of the American Middle West. Revised Edition. Lawrence, KS: University Press of Kansas. ISBN 0-7006-0499-5.
- — (1992). Making Love: An Erotic Odyssey. New York: Simon & Schuster. ISBN 0-671-78227-4.
- — (1993). Nuclear Renewal: Common Sense about Energy. New York: Whittle Books. ISBN 0-670-85207-4.
- — (1995). Dark Sun: The Making of the Hydrogen Bomb. Vol. 1st. New York: Simon & Schuster. ISBN 978-0684804002. OCLC 717414304. OL 7720934M – via Internet Archive.
- — (1995). How to Write: Advice and Reflections. New York: W. Morrow. ISBN 0-688-14095-5.
- Fermi, Rachel; Samra, Esther (1995). Picturing the Bomb: Photographs from the Secret World of the Manhattan Project. introd. Richard Rhodes. New York: H.N. Abrams. ISBN 0-8109-3735-2.
- —; Ginger Rhodes (1996). Trying to Get Some Dignity: Stories of Triumph over Childhood Abuse. New York: W. Morrow. ISBN 0-688-14096-3.
- — (1997). Deadly Feasts: Tracking the Secrets of a Terrifying New Plague. New York: Simon & Schuster. ISBN 0-684-82360-8.
- — (1999). Why They Kill: The Discoveries of a Maverick Criminologist. New York: Alfred A. Knopf. ISBN 0-375-40249-7.
- — (2002). Masters of Death: The SS-Einsatzgruppen and the Invention of the Holocaust. New York: Alfred A. Knopf. ISBN 0-375-40900-9.
- — (2004). John James Audubon: The Making of an American. New York: Alfred A. Knopf. ISBN 0-375-41412-6.
- — (2007). The Ungodly: A Novel of the Donner Party. Palo Alto, CA: Stanford University Press. ISBN 978-0-8047-5641-9.
- — (2007). Arsenals of Folly: The Making of the Nuclear Arms Race. New York: Alfred A. Knopf. ISBN 978-0-375-41413-8.
- — (2010). The Twilight of the Bombs: Recent Challenges, New Dangers, and the Prospects for a World Without Nuclear Weapons. New York: Alfred A. Knopf. ISBN 978-0-307-26754-2.
- — (2011). Hedy's Folly: The Life and Breakthrough Inventions of Hedy Lamarr, the Most Beautiful Woman in the World. Doubleday. ISBN 978-0-385-53438-3.
- — (2015). Hell and Good Company: The Spanish Civil War and the World it Made. Simon & Schuster. ISBN 978-1451696219.
- — (2018). Energy: A Human History. Simon & Schuster. ISBN 978-1501105357.
- — (2021). Scientist: E. O. Wilson: A Life in Nature. Doubleday. ISBN 978-0385545556.

As editor

- Serber, Robert (1992). Rhodes, Richard (ed.). The Los Alamos Primer: The First Lectures on How to Build an Atomic Bomb. Berkeley: University of California Press. ISBN 0-520-07576-5.
- —, ed. (1999). Visions of Technology: A Century of Vital Debate about Machines, Systems, and the Human World. New York: Simon & Schuster. ISBN 0-684-83903-2.
- Audubon, John James (2006). — (ed.). The Audubon Reader. New York: Alfred A. Knopf. ISBN 1-4000-4369-7.

Other

- Foreword to Thompson, Josiah (2021). Last Second in Dallas. University Press of Kansas. ISBN 978-0700630080.
