= Andrew Drumm Institute =

- Drumm, Andrew, Institute
- U.S. National Register of Historic Places
- U.S. Historic district
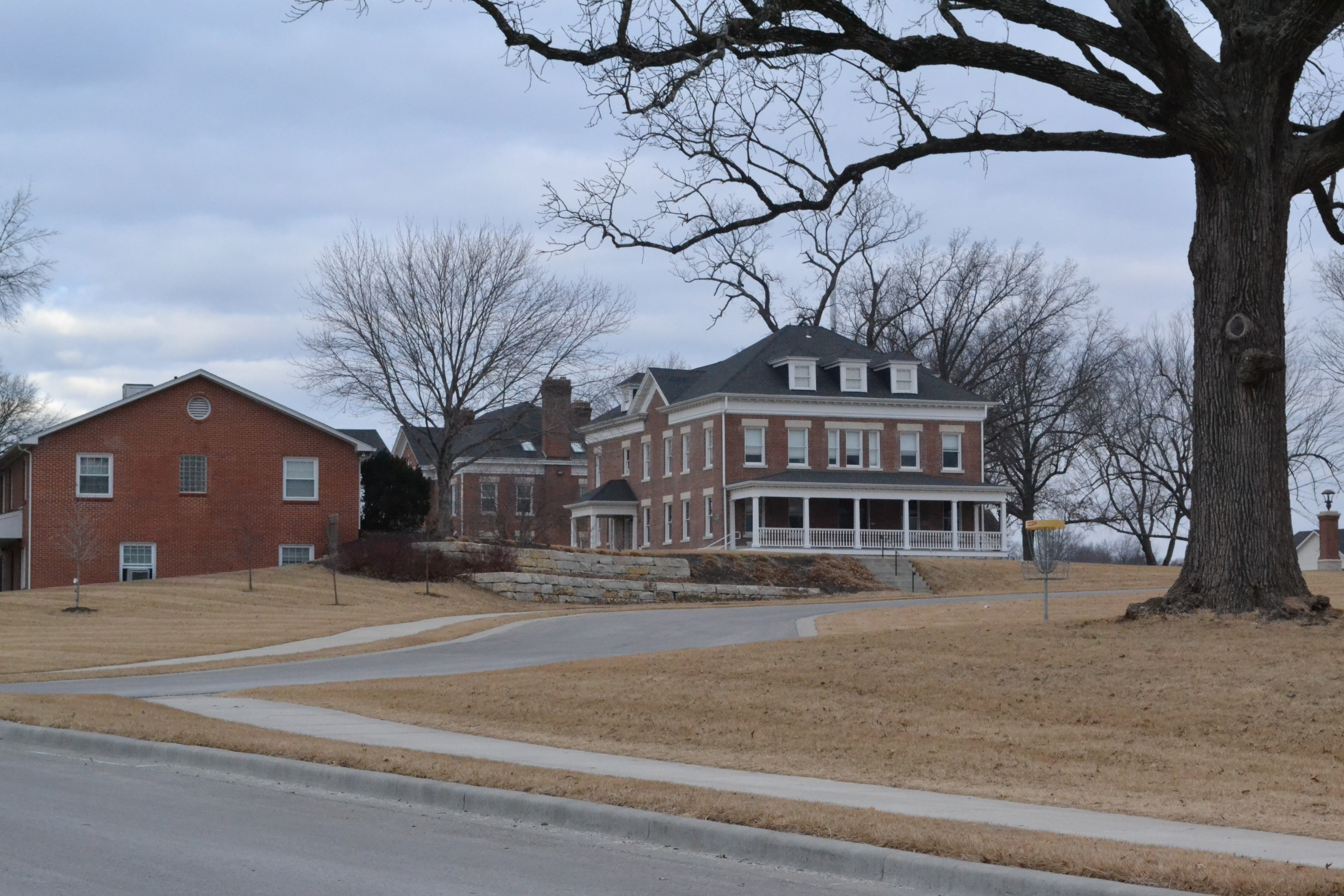

- Location within Missouri Location within the United States
- Location: 3210 Lee's Summit Rd., Independence, Missouri
- Coordinates: 39°03′45″N 94°23′38″W
- Area: 17.3 acres (7.0 ha)
- Built: 1928
- Architect: Robert Weatherford
- Architectural style: Late 19th And 20th Century Revivals
- NRHP reference No.: 06001014
- Added to NRHP: November 3, 2006

The Andrew Drumm Institute was an orphanage for boys near Independence, Missouri. Built on a 370-acre working farm, it provided a means of support and education for disadvantaged boys starting in 1929.

== History ==
Andrew Drumm, the founder of the Drumm Institute, was a successful cattle rancher who had made his fortune in California, Texas, and Oklahoma. Married but childless, he always helped the lesser privileged, especially children. The idea of the institute was outlined in his will. His will described the creation of "a home, school and farm for orphaned or indigent boys." Drumm died in 1919, but he had drawn up his will in 1912.

Andrew Drumm acquired a farm in 1912 to form the basis of his plan to instill self-respect and agriculture skill in indigent boys that would come under the care of the institute. Issues with settling his estate after his death in 1919 delayed the opening of the institute until 1929. The institute was self-supporting through a combination of the endowment from Andrew Drumm, and use of the farm output for food and revenue. The boys had farm and house chores to perform that matched their age and abilities, they and received a small allowance and any profit from their 4-H farm-based projects. The boys' education was a combination of schooling at the institute and well as off-site education at local schools. The institute hosted about 20 boys per year until 1944, when expanded facilities allowed an average of 35 per year, with another expansion in the 1960s leading to a peak of nearly 54 boys in 1970.

Expansion in the 1970s, changes in child labor laws, state licensing requirements and additional regulations limited the institute's ability to be self-sustaining through production and preparation of home grown food. After several failed attempts at re-purposing, an agreement permitting the development of a golf course on the grounds provided a new source of revenue. The institute is currently known as the Drumm Farm Center for Children.

One famous alumni of the institute, Richard Rhodes, wrote about his experiences there in his book A Hole in the World: An American Boyhood (1990).

== Historic district ==
Andrew Drumm Institute was added to the National Register of Historic Places on November 3, 2006. It is a historic district consisting of 10 contributing buildings, primarily the living quarters and classrooms for the boys. After the institute's change away from farming, many of the farm buildings and fencing deteriorated and were removed. A golf course has been built on 209 acres of the surrounding land.

== Bibliography ==
- Rhodes, Richard (1990). A Hole in the World: An American Boyhood. New York: Simon & Schuster. ISBN 0-671-69066-3.
