= The Making of the Atomic Bomb =

1986 history book by Richard Rhodes

- Author: Richard Rhodes
- Subject: Manhattan Project
- Publisher: Simon & Schuster
- Publication date: 1986
- Publication place: United States
- Media type: Print (hardcover & paperback), E-book, Audio
- Pages: 886 (hardcover)
- ISBN: 978-0-671-44133-3
- OCLC: 231117096
- Dewey Decimal: 623.4/5119/09 19
- LC Class: QC773 .R46 1986

The Making of the Atomic Bomb is a history book written by the American journalist and historian Richard Rhodes, first published by Simon & Schuster in 1986. The book won multiple awards, including the Pulitzer Prize for General Nonfiction. The narrative covers people and events from early 20th century discoveries leading to the science of nuclear fission, through the Manhattan Project and the atomic bombings of Hiroshima and Nagasaki.

== Background ==
Before writing The Making of the Atomic Bomb, Richard Rhodes already authored several fiction books, and worked as an independent journalist. He liked science writing, though his only training, in his own words, was "a course at Yale that we called Physics for Poets". When he started to work on the book he found out that "the early papers in nuclear physics were written very clearly".

== Reception ==
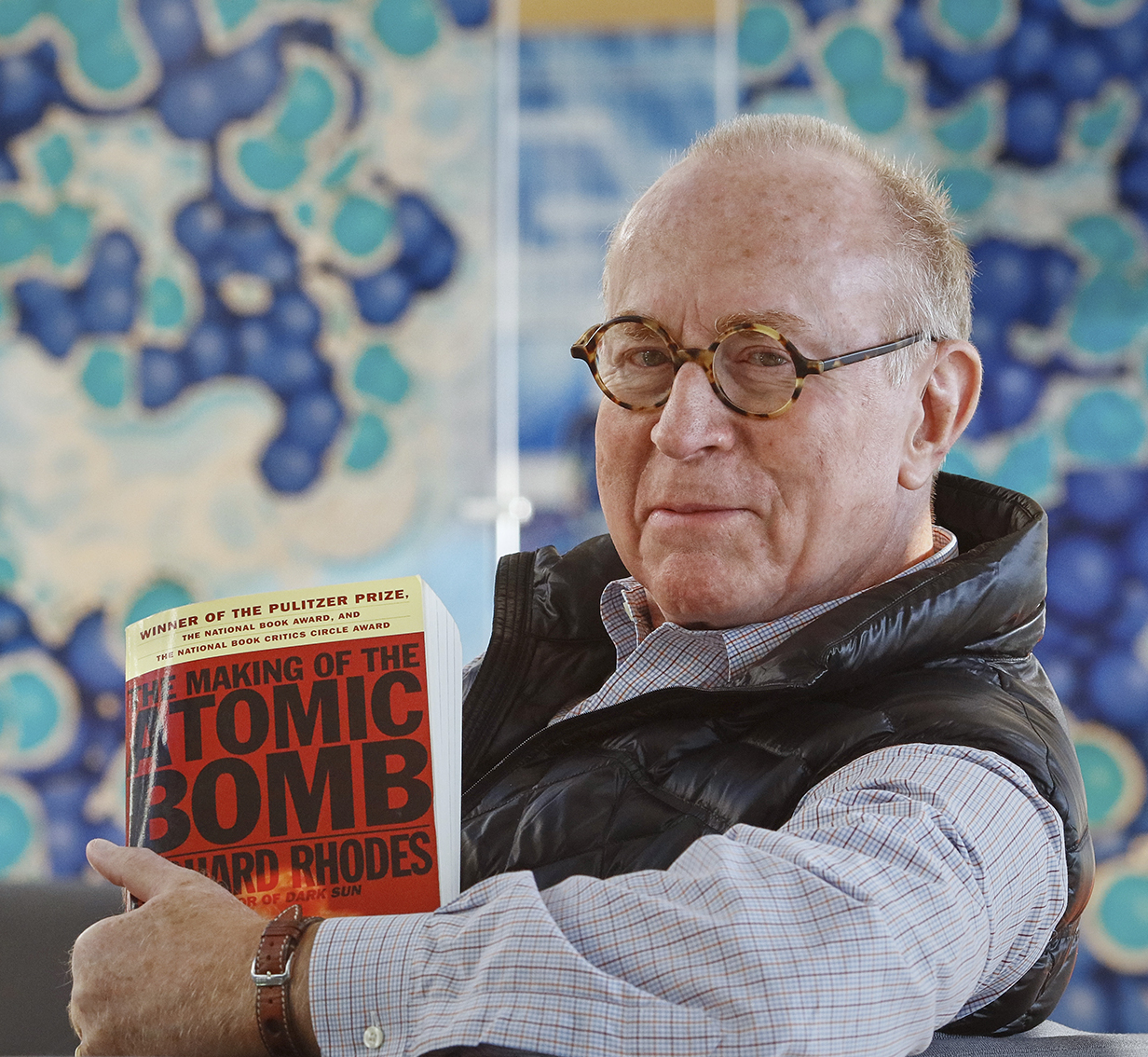
Rhodes with the book, in 2015.

The book was praised both by historians and former Los Alamos weapon engineers and scientists, and is considered to be a general authority on early nuclear weapons history, as well as the development of modern physics in general, during the first half of the 20th century. Nobel Laureate I. I. Rabi, one of the prime participants in the dawn of the atomic age, called it "an epic worthy of Milton. No where else have I seen the whole story put down with such elegance and gusto and in such revealing detail and simple language which carries the reader through wonderful and profound scientific discoveries and their application." As reported by The New York Times, Rabi's wife "read him the whole book, and he was pleased with it".

Solly Zuckerman wrote in his review: "I have no doubt that his book will stand for years to come as an authoritative account of the way our nuclear age started. Above all, lengthy as it is, it will be enjoyed as a magnificent read."

The historian of science Lawrence Badash writes positively about the book, but notes Rhodes' descriptions of sketchy biographies unconvincing: "'human interest' material of questionable accuracy becomes psycho-babble", though he notes that "the book is accurate and the characters are well drawn". He concludes that "Altogether Rhodes has produced the most readable, exciting and just book to date that covers both the bomb and the preceding four decades".

William J. Broad praised the book in The New York Times review, writing that it "offers not only the best overview of the century's pivotal event, but a probing analysis of what it means for the future." He especially noted the vast bibliography, "the characters speak in their own voices, in long paragraphs of direct quotation". Another reviewer writes that "If it is the bomb which defines the twentieth century as at once dreadful and rewarding ... then the present book captures this range", and also praised the extensive bibliography. Another review calls it "an exceptionally well-written account of the building and use of the first nuclear weapons".

Sally Smith Hughes notes that while "Rhodes is neither a scientist nor science writer", this "may explain the freshness of his approach and his ability to convey difficult science in layman's terms." She notes the usage of oral histories by the author: Rhodes writes about 21 participants of the events who "generously made time for interviews and correspondence"; he also used oral histories collected by the American Institute of Physics.

Barton Bernstein praised the book, and called it "a compelling book of drama and tragedy, of passion and commitment, and of moral lament. It is historical journalism on a grand scale, with rich detail, colorful scenes, recreated conversations, vivid portraits, and gripping vignettes chronicling the lengthy scientific and political roads to Hiroshima, and briefly beyond". Besides that, his review also contains criticism, as he writes that sometimes "narrative strategy ... neglects analysis, sometimes sacrifices the important to the vivid, and encourages an uncritical use of sources and possibly even skimpy archival research".

Angelo Collins of Stanford University also praised the book, noting that it "is not a pleasure to read (it is thought provoking and makes the reader uneasy) and it is not easy to read (it is long and there are many characters and many settings). But it is fascinating." Carol S. Gruber writes that the "comprehensiveness and the framework within which its main story unfolds, it broadens and deepens our understanding of the familiar subject; and it is a very good read."

Robert Seidel in his essay on the books that cover the Manhattan Project writes that "Rhodes's account is more comprehensive, thoughtful, and accurate than the standard popular history ... the book is a "good read" and makes use of reliable sources critically. We would ask little more of a professional history."

Barton C. Hacker notes that it "reads much like a novel and, like a good novel, can be hard to put down", but also writes about what the book lacks:

What the book lacks, however, is any sustained attention to the institutional shaping and constraint of events. A grant from the Rockefeller Foundation or a Nobel Prize arrives as a virtual deus ex machina just when a scientist needs to study in Berlin or flee fascism—no hint is given that such awards might be something other than natural phenomena. Even the Manhattan Project often seems more a matter of a physicist's views clashing with a soldier's, or a daring foray into the war zone to learn the status of German nuclear research, than the rapid construction and widespread operations of an enterprise that rivaled in size the prewar American automobile industry. Conducting experiments fills many more pages than building production plants.... I suspect Rhodes really wanted to write the epic of the atomic bomb, an "Atomiad" if you will. Maybe he has.

Matthew Bunn notes Rhodes' descriptions of the Hiroshima and Nagasaki bombings, writing that they are "excruciating, densely layered with gruesome but telling first-hand accounts of the horrors the bombs inflicted"; he called the book "a wide-ranging tale of the physics and engineering of the bomb, the personalities involved, and the larger story of how society came to think about war".

In 2023, the book became popular among artificial intelligence researchers. The Atlantic reported that "A generation of AI researchers treat Richard Rhodes's seminal book like a Bible as they develop technology with the potential to remake—or ruin—our world."

== Awards ==
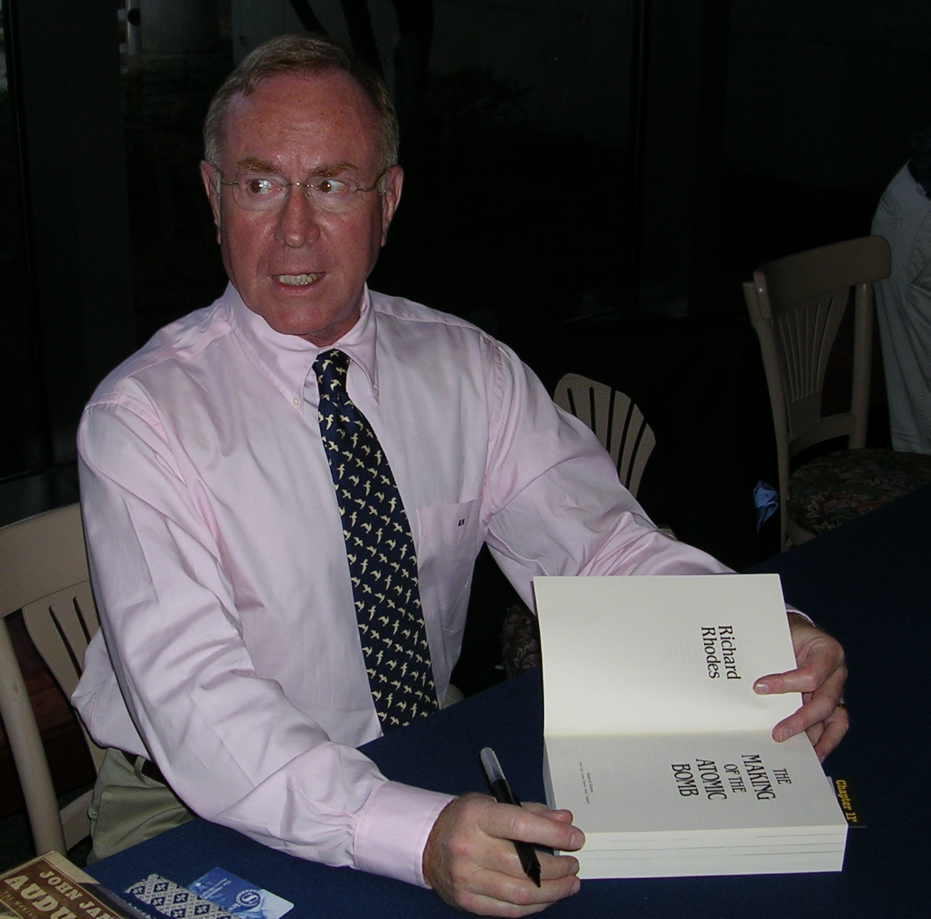
Rhodes signs a copy of The Making of the Atomic Bomb, 2004

- 1988 Pulitzer Prize for General Nonfiction
- 1987 National Book Award for Nonfiction
- 1987 National Book Critics Circle Award

== Subsequent books ==
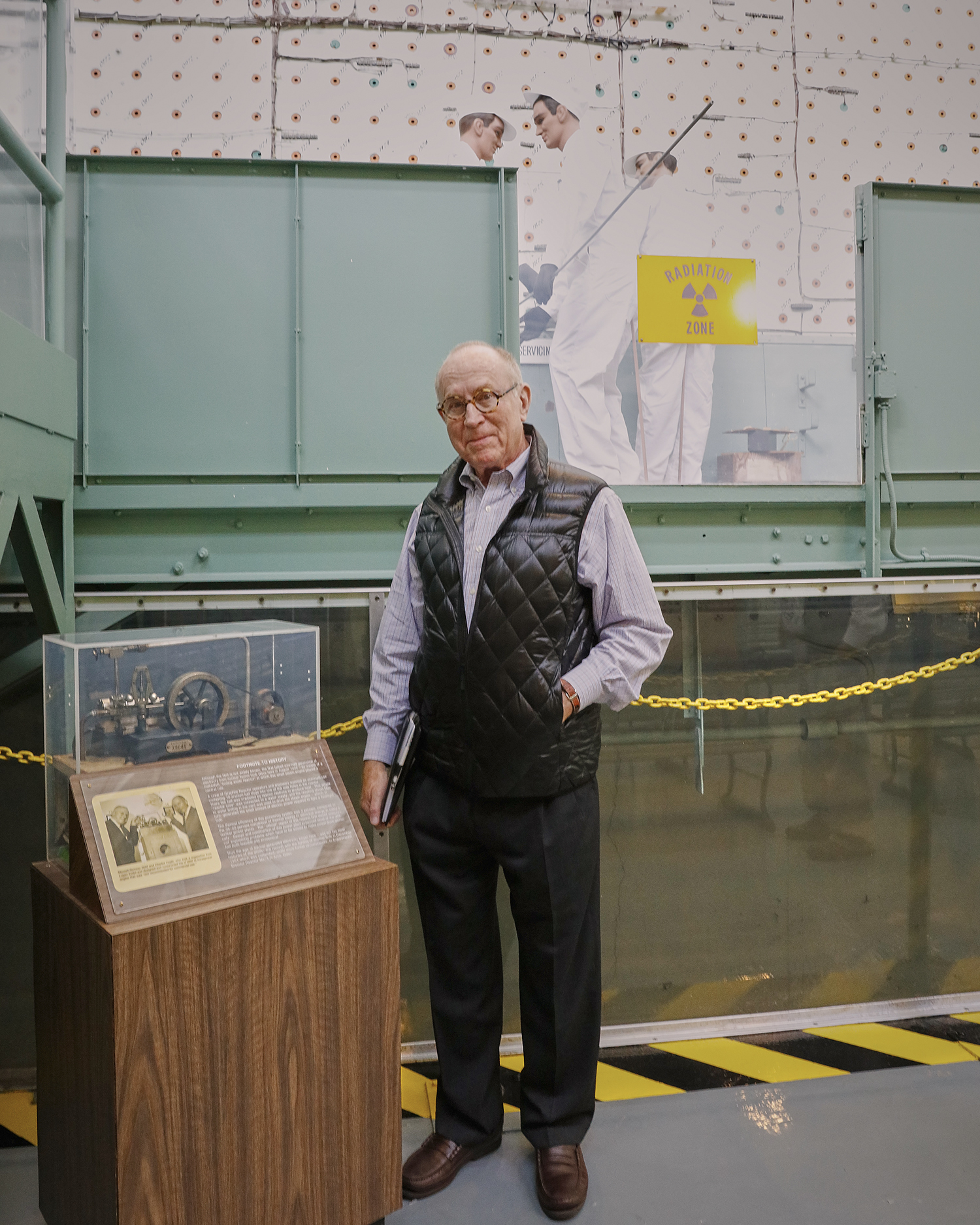
Rhodes visits the Oak Ridge National Laboratory, 2015

Rhodes continued The Making of the Atomic Bomb with three more books on nuclear history; Nicholas Thompson calls it his "four-volume epic".

In 1995 Rhodes published Dark Sun: The Making of the Hydrogen Bomb, which told the story of the atomic espionage during World War II, the debates over whether the hydrogen bomb ought to be produced, and the eventual creation of the bomb and its consequences for the arms race. Dark Sun received a positive review from the physicist Hans Bethe, who participated in the Manhattan Project. In 2007, Rhodes continued the series with the Arsenals of Folly: The Making of the Nuclear Arms Race, a chronicle of the arms buildups during the Cold War, especially focusing on Mikhail Gorbachev and the Reagan administration. The Twilight of the Bombs, the final volume, was published in 2010. The book documents the post–Cold War nuclear history of the world, nuclear proliferation, and nuclear terrorism.

In 1992, Rhodes edited and wrote the introduction to an annotated version of The Los Alamos Primer, written by Manhattan Project scientist Robert Serber. The Primer was a set of lectures given to new arrivals at the secret Los Alamos Laboratory during wartime to get them up to speed about the prominent questions needing to be solved in bomb design, and had been largely declassified in 1965, but was not widely available. In 1994, he published Nuclear Renewal: Common Sense about Energy detailing the history of the nuclear power industry in the United States, and future promises of nuclear power.
