= Military Policy Committee =

1942 group to plan using the atomic bomb

The Military Policy Committee was set up in September 1942 to supervise the operation of the Manhattan Project run by General Groves as the members of the policy group (Vice-president Henry A. Wallace, Secretary of War Henry Stimson and General George C. Marshall) had many other duties and could not give the time for adequate supervision. Groves objected to Stinson’s proposal for a committee of seven or nine members as he preferred a committee of three; he could keep three people well informed. So it was set up with Bush or Conant as alternates for chairman plus Rear Admiral William R. Purnell of the Navy and Groves. Later Stinson decided that the Army member should be Wilhelm D. Styer not Groves.

Scientists were paid (after consultation with the Military Policy Committee) at the salary they were already receiving. This caused problems in recruiting specialised staff, as they could not be compensated for living in a remote locality like Los Alamos (this was more of a problem with scientists rather than engineers). The pay of those formerly paid for a nine-month year was increased to pay for the full twelve months. However this meant that Oppenheimer who had been paid by a state university originally received much less than some of his subordinates who came from large Eastern schools. Groves decided to make an exception for Oppie and increased his salary to be equal to that of the others (without consulting him).

The Military Policy Committee was superseded by the Interim Committee of nine civilians in May 1945.

The Target Committee was set up by General Groves when he was asked by General George C. Marshall to plan for the dropping of the atomic bomb, which had been repeatedly discussed over and over by the Military Policy Committee. The committee was under the charge of Thomas Farrell. The Committee first met on 27 April, then on 2 May 1945 in Washington and 10 May at Los Alamos.

Groves emphasized the need for four targets, with three for each attack; for visual (not radar) bombing unless the bomber could not return with the bomb; and consideration of the range of the B-29 Superfortress. General Marshall said that the ports on the West Coast of Japan should be considered as they were a vital link to the Asiatic mainland. They were to use conservative estimate of the bomb's power, which was then 5,000 to 15,000 tons of TNT (Little Boy) or 700 to 5,000 tons of TNT (Fat Man). These would also set the desirable height of detonation.

Groves thought that targeting should be kept in Washington, although some Air Force people on the committee thought that like any other new weapon it should be given to the field commander to be used with complete freedom of action. But (as in the deletion of Kyoto from the list), Secretary of War Henry Stimson would have the final say. Stimson deleted Kyoto from the list which he had visited when he was Governor-general of the Philippines; it had impressed him with its ancient culture; it was of great religious significance and was the ancient capital of Japan. Groves had noted its size and expected number of small factories, plus it was large enough in area to gain complete knowledge of the effects of an atomic bomb. Harrison sent him a message from Groves to the Potsdam Conference, but he still disapproved and the next day replied that Truman concurred, so there was no more talk about Kyoto after that. Later he spoke to Arnold who kept it on the list of targets barred from conventional bombing so it would not be subject to a conventional bombing attack. Postwar he was glad at its removal from the target list, as (with the much smaller population of Nagasaki) this greatly reduced the number of Japanese casualties.

The members listed by Groves were:

From the Manhattan Engineer District:

- Thomas Farrell
- John Von Neumann
- R B Wilson (probably Roscoe C. Wilson)
- William G. Penney (British)

From Henry H. Arnold’s office:

- William P Fisher
- David M. Dennison
- Dr J C Stearns: probably Joyce C. Stearns; although the article on him suggests that Groves was mistaken and the Target Committee member might be Robert Stearns.
