= List of things named after Glenn T. Seaborg =

This is a list of things named after the Nobel Prize-winning American chemist Glenn T. Seaborg (1912–1999). Known for his considerable legacy, Seaborg was once listed in the Guinness Book of World Records for having the longest entry in Marquis Who's Who. His legacy was cemented with the naming of element 106 as seaborgium in his honor. He is the first of two individuals (the other being Yuri Oganessian) to have had an element named after them during their lifetime (the names einsteinium and fermium were proposed when Einstein and Fermi were alive, but were not approved until after their deaths).

== List ==
The following list of things named after Glenn T. Seaborg supplements his biographical entry:

- Seaborgium, a synthetic chemical element with the symbol Sg and atomic number 106
- Glenn T. Seaborg Center, Northern Michigan University
- Seaborg is an IBM RS/6000 SP supercomputer at Lawrence Berkeley National Laboratory
- Local Lodge Glenn T. Seaborg #719, Vasa Order of America. The Seaborg Lodge also offers the Seaborg Scholarship.
- The Glenn T. Seaborg Medal has been awarded by the UCLA Department of Chemistry and Biochemistry since 1987 to honor significant contributions to chemistry.
- The American Nuclear Society (ANS) Seaborg Medal is awarded to recognize exceptional achievement in nuclear science or engineering.
- A Glenn T. Seaborg Actinide Separation Award presented at the annual Actinide Separation Conference
- The Glenn T. Seaborg Award for Nuclear Chemistry is awarded annually by the Nuclear Chemistry and Technology Division of the American Chemical Society.
- The Glenn T. Seaborg Institute (GTSI) at Lawrence Berkeley National Laboratory studies the impact of radionuclides in the environment.
- The Glenn T. Seaborg Institute (GTSI) at Los Alamos National Laboratory (LANL) studies plutonium and heavy elements.
- The Glenn T. Seaborg Institute (GTSI) at Lawrence Livermore National Laboratory (LLNL) studies bionuclear science.
- The Glenn T. Seaborg Center (GTSC) at the Lawrence Berkeley National Laboratory is a part of the Chemical Sciences Division and studies the chemistry of transactinide elements.
- Glenn Seaborg Fellowships are offered by the Lawrence Berkeley National Laboratory.
- Glenn Seaborg Postdoctoral Fellowship, Argonne National Laboratory
- The Seaborg Prize, awarded to the elected leader of 40 high school students selected in the Intel Science Talent Search
- Glenn T. Seaborg Award for Nuclear Chemistry sponsored by the ACS Division of Nuclear Chemistry and Technology
- Glenn T. Seaborg Science Award was established by the Swedish Council of America in 1979 and is awarded to a student enrolled in science or mathematics at one of six colleges and universities founded by Swedish immigrants.
- Glenn T. Seaborg Scholarship, Swedish Club of Los Angeles
- Dr. Glenn Seaborg Way, South Gate, California. It has been proposed as the future site of the Seaborg Home.
- Seaborg Road, Lawrence Berkeley National Laboratory
- Seaborg Lane, Ventura, California
- Glenn Seaborg Trail, Department of Energy, Germantown, Maryland
- Seaborg Fellow in Nuclear History, fellowship offered by the U.S. Department of Energy
- Seaborg Trail, Briones Regional Park, near Lafayette, California
- Glenn T. Seaborg National Public Leadership Award, American Hiking Society
- Seaborg Open Space Fund, a non-profit foundation, was founded by David Seaborg in his father's honor.
- Glenn T. Seaborg Award at the UC Berkeley Athletic Department, is given to a University of California football player who distinguishes himself after graduation.
- The Glenn Seaborg Learning Consortium, Lafayette Library and Learning Center, Lafayette, California
- Asteroid 4856 Seaborg, discovered by Carolyn Shoemaker at Palomar in 1983, was named in his honor. The official naming citation was published by the Minor Planet Center on 17 March 1995 (M.P.C. 24916).
- Seaborg Field at David Starr Jordan High School a high school football field in Watts, California in which they show pride in their most prominent alumnus
- Seaborg Technologies is a Danish-based company developing a novel type of nuclear reactor, the Molten salt reactor.
