= Margaret Melhase =

American chemistry student and co-discoverer of caesium-137 (1919–2006)

Margaret Melhase Fuchs
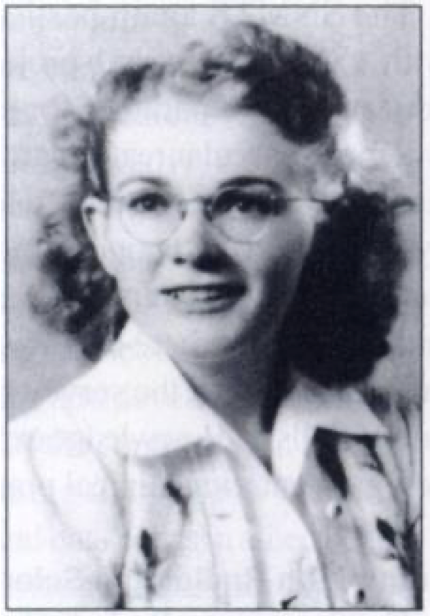
- Margaret Melhase as an undergraduate at UC Berkeley c. 1941
- Born: Margaret Melhase; August 13, 1919; Berkeley, California
- Died: August 8, 2006 (aged 86); Menlo Park, California
- Education: University of California, Berkeley
- Scientific career
- Academic advisors: Glenn T. Seaborg

Margaret Melhase Fuchs (August 13, 1919 – August 8, 2006) was an American chemist and a co-discoverer, with Glenn T. Seaborg, of the isotope caesium-137.

== Education and research career ==
In 1940, Melhase was an undergraduate in the college of chemistry at the University of California, Berkeley. She was president of the Student Affiliates of the American Chemical Society and was considering doctoral studies and a career in chemistry. Honors students typically took on research projects at the time, and she sought advice from her close friend, nuclear chemist Gerhart Friedlander; Friedlander was then a graduate student under the supervision of Glenn T. Seaborg, and he suggested she approach him for a project. She spoke to Seaborg in his lab, and he proposed they work together to search for a Group 1 element among the fission products of uranium. Her laboratory was above those of Nobel Prize winners Willard Libby and Melvin Calvin.

In March 1941, Melhase worked with Art Wahl. He handed her 100 grams of a uranium compound (uranyl nitrate) that had been neutron-irradiated by a cyclotron. Using a Lauritzen quartz fiber electroscope, she discovered the Cs-137 several months later. Despite establishing herself as a promising young experimental scientist, nuclear research during World War II was treated with strict secrecy and it was not publicized. Significant research on the isotope followed, but their results were not made available until after the war.

Melhase received a bachelor's degree in nuclear chemistry and planned to apply for graduate studies at UC Berkeley. However, the head of the chemistry department, Gilbert N. Lewis, was refusing entry to women; the last woman the department admitted had gotten married shortly after her graduation and he considered her education a "waste". She worked for the Philadelphia Quartz Company in El Cerrito, California. She rejoined the Manhattan Project from 1944 to 1946. Without an advanced degree, she did not continue her career in science.

Though references to her work are scant, Seaborg shares credit of his discovery of Cs-137 with her. Writing in 1961, he stated:

I am considering including a short description of the discovery of radioactive cesium 137 in one of my talks. I believe that the work you did with me during 1941 on the identification of this isotope as a fission product of uranium constitutes the first observation of this isotope.

— Glenn T. Seaborg, correspondence with Melhase Fuchs in 1961

He also wrote in 1990 that "it is appropriate to credit both G. T. Seaborg and M. Melhase for the 'birth' of cesium 137."

== Personal life ==
Margaret was an only child, born in Berkeley, California to mother Margaret Orchard and father John Melhase, who worked as a geologist. During her time at UC Berkeley, Melhase was a member of the Berkeley Folk Dancers and edited the group's newsletter. She met mathematics professor Robert A. Fuchs at a folk dance, and the two married in 1945 and had three children. She and her husband moved to Los Angeles. She was a supporter of social causes, organizing marches for agricultural workers and housing and aiding immigrant Laotian families in Los Angeles.
