= Gerhart Friedlander =

American nuclear chemist (1916–2009)

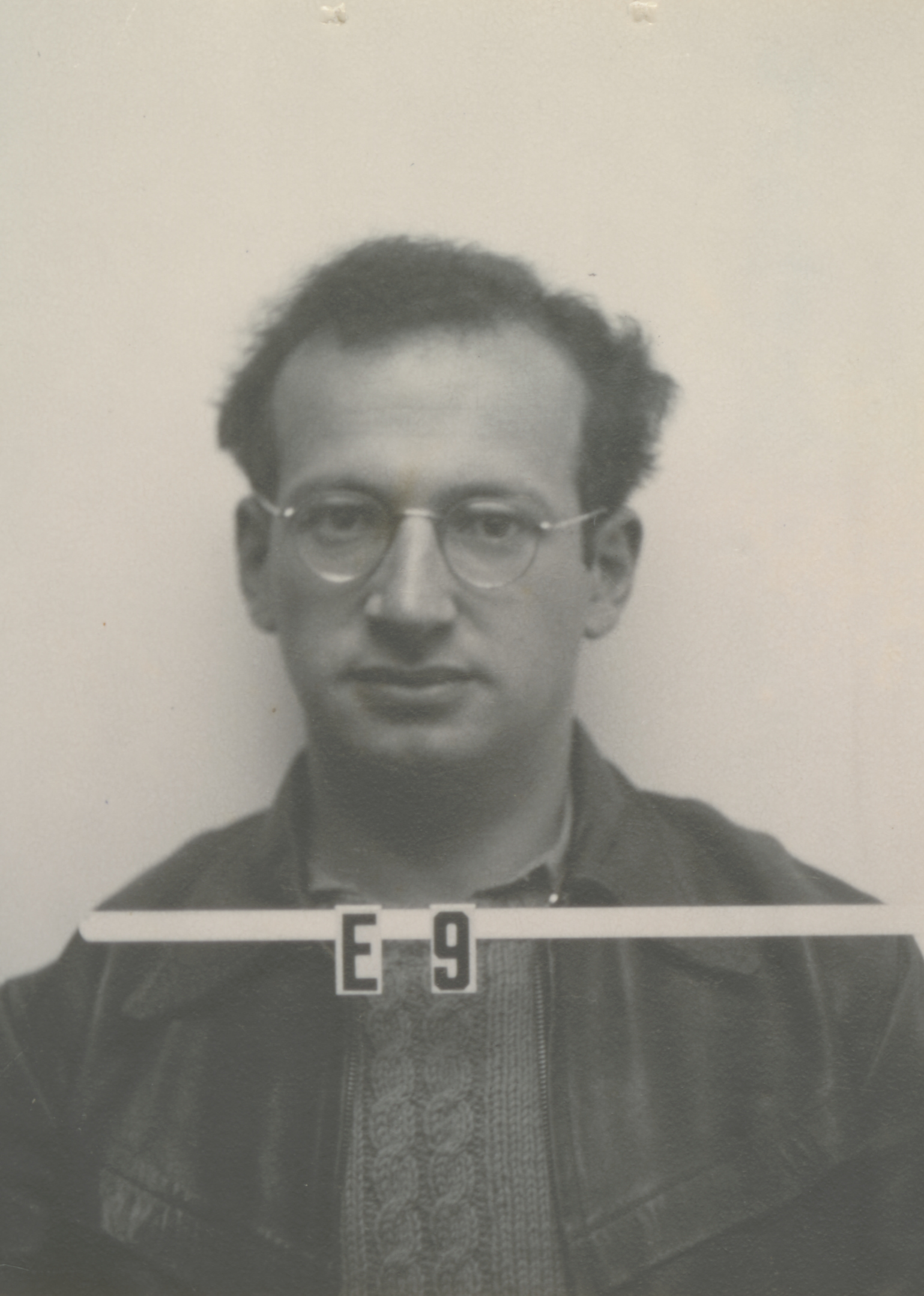
- Friedlander's Los Alamos Laboratory identity photo
- Born: July 28, 1916; Munich, German Empire
- Died: September 6, 2009 (aged 93); South Setauket, New York, U.S.
- Education: University of California, Berkeley
- Scientific career
- Fields: Nuclear chemistry
- Workplaces: Brookhaven National Laboratory

Gerhart Friedlander (July 28, 1916 – September 6, 2009) was an American nuclear chemist who worked on the Manhattan Project.

Friedlander was born in Munich, and fled Nazi Germany for the United States in 1936. After emigrating, he studied with Glenn Seaborg at the University of California, Berkeley, earning a PhD in 1942. In 1943, he joined the Manhattan Project, and in 1944 became the leader of the radioactive lanthanum (RaLa) group in the Chemistry Division.

After the war, he was a research associate at General Electric from 1946-1948, lectured at Washington University in St. Louis in 1948, and then spent the bulk of his career at Brookhaven National Laboratory, where he served as head of the chemistry department between 1968 and 1977. He conducted fundamental research into the mechanics of nuclear reactions, developing models that remained in use at the time of his death. Friedlander also played a leading role in advocating for and preparing a gallium solar-neutrino experiment, which evolved into the GALLEX experiment in Italy.

Along with Joseph W. Kennedy, he was the co-author of Nuclear and Radiochemistry, a classic textbook on nuclear chemistry.
