= Actinide concept =

Proposal of a second inner transition series in the periodic table

In nuclear chemistry, the actinide concept (also known as the actinide hypothesis) proposed that the actinides form a second inner transition series homologous to the lanthanides. Its origins stem from observation of lanthanide-like properties in transuranic elements in contrast to the distinct complex chemistry of previously known actinides. Glenn Theodore Seaborg, one of the researchers who synthesized transuranic elements, proposed the actinide concept in 1944 as an explanation for observed deviations and a hypothesis to guide future experiments. It was accepted shortly thereafter, resulting in the placement of a new actinide series comprising elements 89 (actinium) to 103 (lawrencium) below the lanthanides in Dmitri Mendeleev's periodic table of the elements.

== Origin ==
Periodic table illustrating the placement of thorium and uranium as transition metals. Although hafnium was not known at the time, thorium was assumed to follow periodicity of group 4 and thus was placed there, and uranium was placed in group 6 below tungsten.

In the late 1930s, the first four actinides (actinium, thorium, protactinium, and uranium) were known. They were believed to form a fourth series of transition metals, characterized by the filling of 6d orbitals, in which thorium, protactinium, and uranium were respective homologs of hafnium, tantalum, and tungsten. This view was widely accepted as chemical investigations of these elements revealed various high oxidation states and characteristics that closely resembled the 5d transition metals. Nevertheless, research into quantum theory by Niels Bohr and subsequent publications proposed that these elements should constitute a 5f series analogous to the lanthanides, with calculations that the first 5f electron should appear in the range from atomic number 90 (thorium) to 99 (einsteinium). Inconsistencies between theoretical models and known chemical properties thus made it difficult to place these elements in the periodic table.

The first appearance of the actinide concept may have been in a 32-column periodic table constructed by Alfred Werner in 1905. Upon determining the arrangement of the lanthanides in the periodic table, he placed thorium as a heavier homolog of cerium, and left spaces for hypothetical radioelements in the seventh period, though he did not establish the correct order of the known actinides.

Following the discoveries of transuranic elements neptunium and plutonium in 1940 and preliminary investigations of their chemistry, their placement as a fourth transition metal series was challenged. These new elements exhibited various properties that suggested a close chemical similarity to uranium rather than their supposed transition metal homologs (rhenium and osmium), such as most saliently not exhibiting stable +7 or +8 oxidation states. McMillan and Abelson thus proposed already in 1940 "that there may be a second "rare earth" group of similar elements starting with uranium."

Subsequent experiments targeting the then-unknown elements americium and curium raised further questions. Seaborg et al. failed to identify these elements under the premise that they were transition metals, but they were successfully separated and discovered in 1944, following the assumption that they would be chemically similar to the lanthanides. Further experiments corroborated the hypothesis of an actinide (then referred to as "thorides" or "uranides") series. A spectroscopic study at the Los Alamos National Laboratory by McMillan, Wahl, and Zachariasen indicated that 5f orbitals, rather than 6d orbitals, were being filled. However, these studies could not unambiguously determine the first element with 5f electrons and therefore the first element in the actinide series.

== Acceptance ==
The discoveries of americium and curium under the hypothesis that they resembled the lanthanides prompted Seaborg to propose the concept of an actinide series to his colleagues in 1944 – with the central premise being similarity to the lanthanides and filling of f orbitals. Despite its apparent correctness, they did not recommend Seaborg to submit a communication to Chemical and Engineering News, fearing that it was a radical idea that would ruin his reputation. He nevertheless submitted it and it gained widespread acceptance; new periodic tables thus placed the actinides below the lanthanides. Following its acceptance, the actinide concept proved pivotal in the groundwork for discoveries of heavier elements, such as berkelium in 1949. The actinide concept explained some of the observed properties of the first few actinides, namely the presence of +4 to +6 oxidation states, and proposed hybridization of the 5f and 6d orbitals, whose electrons were shown to be loosely bound in these elements. It also supported experimental results for a trend towards +3 oxidation states in the elements beyond americium.

Further elaborations on the actinide concept led Seaborg to propose two more series of elements continuing the established periodicity. He proposed a transactinide series from atomic number 104 to 121 and a superactinide series from atomic number 122 to 153.

== See also ==
- Actinide
- History of the periodic table
- Mendeleev's predicted elements
