= Joseph W. Kennedy =

American scientist (1916–1957)

Joseph William Kennedy
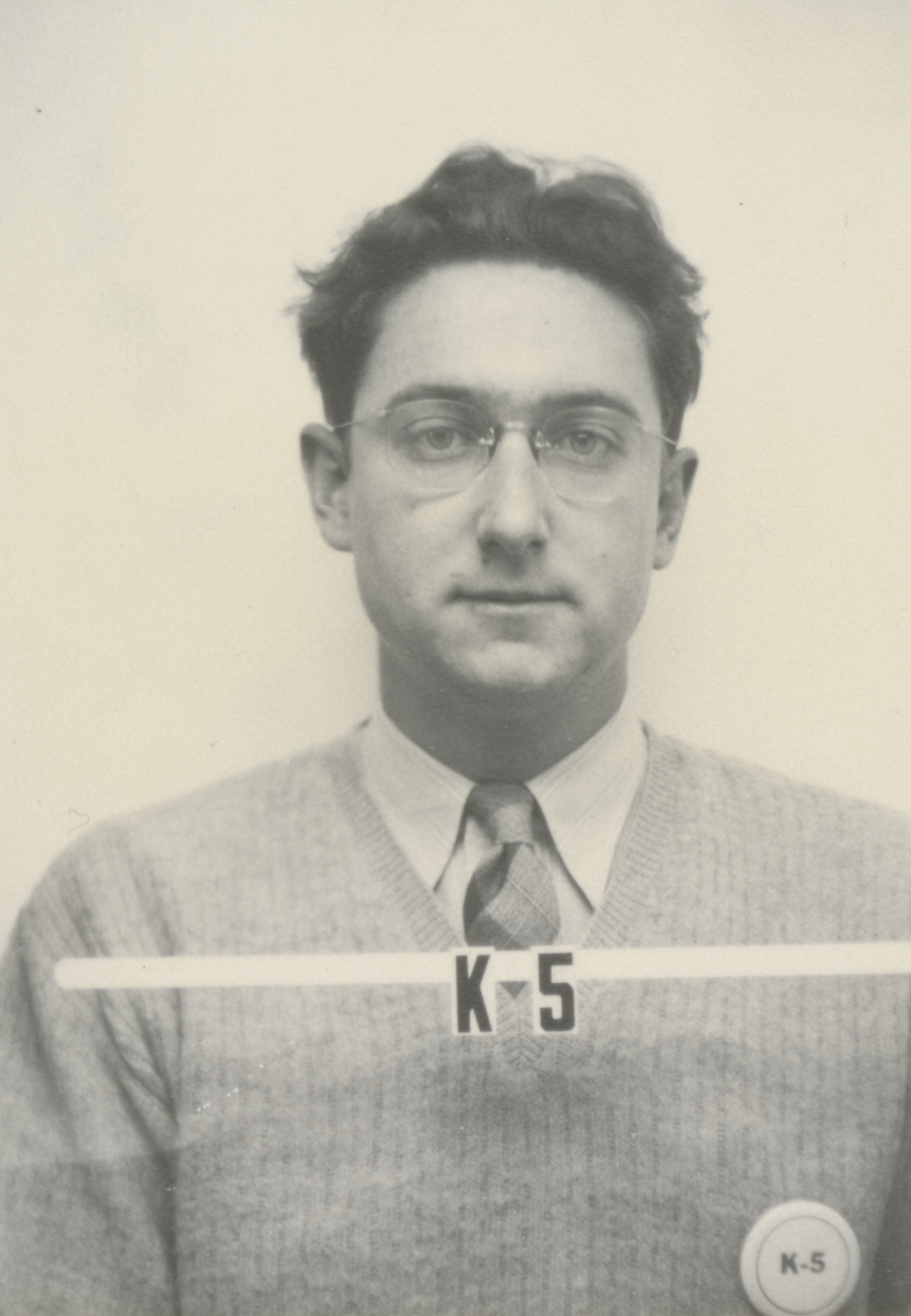
- Joseph William Kennedy c. 1944
- Born: May 30, 1916; Nacogdoches, Texas
- Died: May 5, 1957 (aged 40); St. Louis, Missouri
- Citizenship: American
- Education: Stephen F. Austin State University (BA); University of Kansas (MA); University of California, Berkeley (PhD)
- Known for: First Isolation of Plutonium
- Awards: Medal for Merit (1946)
- Scientific career
- Fields: Chemistry
- Workplaces: Los Alamos National Laboratory; Washington University in St. Louis
- Thesis: Studies of nuclear isomerism in tellurium, element 43, and zinc (1939)
- Doctoral advisor: George Ernest Gibson

Joseph William Kennedy (May 30, 1916 – May 5, 1957) was an American chemist who co-discovered plutonium, along with Glenn T. Seaborg, Edwin McMillan, and Arthur Wahl. During World War II, he led the CM (Chemistry and Metallurgy) Division at the Manhattan Project's Los Alamos Laboratory, where he oversaw research onto the chemistry and metallurgy of uranium and plutonium. After the war, he was recruited as a professor at Washington University in St. Louis, where he is credited with transforming a university primarily concerned with undergraduate teaching into one that also boasts strong graduate and research programs. He died of cancer of the stomach at the age of 40.

== Early life ==
Joseph William Kennedy was born in Nacogdoches, Texas, on May 30, 1916, the son of Joseph and Mattie Kennedy. He lived in Center, Texas, for seven years before entering college. He attended Stephen F. Austin State Teachers College, from which he received a Bachelor of Arts (BA) degree, and the University of Kansas, which awarded him a Master of Arts (MA) degree. He then entered the University of California, Berkeley, where he earned his Doctor of Philosophy (PhD) degree, writing his thesis on "Studies of nuclear isomerism in tellurium, element 43, and zinc", under the supervision of George Ernest Gibson.

== Plutonium ==
In February 1940, Glenn Seaborg and Edwin McMillan produced plutonium-239 by bombarding uranium with deuterons. This produced neptunium, element 93, which underwent beta-decay to form a new element, plutonium, with 94 protons. Kennedy built a series of detectors and counters to verify the presence of plutonium. He used mica sliced razor thin to produce a window to count alpha particle emissions, and an ionization chamber with a magnetic field to separate the beta particles from the neptunium from alpha particles from the plutonium.

On March 28, 1941, Seaborg, physicist Emilio Segrè, and Kennedy demonstrated not only the presence of plutonium, but that it was also fissile, an important distinction that was crucial to the decisions made in directing Manhattan Project research. Arthur Wahl then began exploring the chemistry of the newly discovered element. In 1966, Room 307 of Gilman Hall on the campus at Berkeley, where they did this work, was declared a U.S. National Historic Landmark.

== Manhattan Project ==
Kennedy was one of the early recruits to Manhattan Project's Los Alamos Laboratory, arriving in March 1943. He became acting head of the Chemistry and Metallurgy (CM) Division. Some project leaders had doubts about Kennedy, who was only 26 years old. An approach was therefore made to Charles Thomas from Monsanto. Thomas agreed to co-ordinate the Chemistry efforts of the different Manhattan Project laboratories, but he did not wish to move to New Mexico. Despite his youth, Kennedy officially became CM Division leader in April 1944.

The CM Division was responsible for the purification and fabrication of materials for the bomb, including the core, tamper and initiator. The chemistry and metallurgy of uranium was fairly well known, although it did yield a few surprises, but that of plutonium was almost completely unknown. The element had only been discovered a short time before, and existed only in microgram amounts. Educated guesses about its chemistry tended to be wrong, and as research progressed it was found to have unusual properties, including no less than six allotropes. There was rivalry between its discoverers, with Wahl and Kennedy's group at Los Alamos competing with Seaborg's in Chicago to produce the best process for purifying the metal. This competition ended abruptly when Segrè's group at Los Alamos discovered that high levels of a hitherto undiscovered plutonium-240 isotope in reactor-produced plutonium meant that an implosion-type nuclear weapon was required, and a high degree of purity was therefore unnecessary.

Kennedy's chemists were able to reduce uranium hydride to uranium-235 metal with 99.96% efficiency, and the metallurgists worked out how to cast and press it into the required shapes. While the chemists worked out how to purify plutonium, the metallurgists had to figure out how to cast it into a solid sphere. Eric Jette's CM-8 (Uranium and Plutonium Metallurgy) group found that they could stabilise plutonium in its malleable δ phase by alloying it with gallium. For his services, he was awarded the Medal for Merit by the President Harry S. Truman in 1946.

== In popular culture ==
In the 2023 film Oppenheimer, Joseph W. Kennedy is portrayed by actor Troy Bronson. Directed by Christopher Nolan, the film highlights the importance of plutonium. While the project was a collaborative effort with Glenn T. Seaborg, Edwin McMillan, and Arthur Wahl, Nolan’s portrayal honors the collective endeavor while also crediting Kennedy as the key discoverer, adeptly balancing team dynamics with individual achievement.

In real life, President Harry S. Truman, portrayed by Gary Oldman, awarded Kennedy the Medal for Merit for his contributions. The Medal for Merit was the highest civilian decoration of the United States, with only four awardees from the Manhattan Project at Los Alamos: J. Robert Oppenheimer, John von Neumann, Enrico Fermi, and Kennedy.

The film Oppenheimer won a total of seven Oscars at the 2024 Academy Awards, including Best Picture. The film is based on the book American Prometheus.

== Post war ==
In 1945, Kennedy was recruited to be a professor at Washington University in St. Louis, which installed him as chairman of the department of chemistry in 1946, a role he continued in until his death. Kennedy brought with him Wahl, Lindsay Helmholz, David Lipkin, Herbert Potratz, and Samuel Weissman, who all served on the faculty at Washington University. Up to this time, Washington University was primarily concerned with undergraduate teaching. Kennedy is credited with transforming it into a university that also has boasts strong graduate and research programs.

Along with Seaborg, McMillan and Wahl, Kennedy received $400,000 from the Atomic Energy Commission in compensation for their scientific work. He died on May 5, 1957, at the age of 40 after a battle with cancer of the stomach. The Kennedy Lecture series is named in his honor. It is given every year in Washington University.
