= Sue Brannon Clark =

Environmental radiochemist

Sue Brannon Clark is an environmental radiochemist. Since receiving her doctorate in inorganic and radiochemistry from Florida State University in 1989, Clark has worked at Washington State University where she leads a research team on the chemistry and chemical engineering of processing nuclear materials. She has also held various leadership roles at WSU, including serving as interim vice chancellor for academic affairs and interim dean of the college of sciences.

Clark has been appointed to numerous boards and committees, such as the US Nuclear Waste Technical Review Board and the Basic Energy Sciences Advisory Committee for the US Department of Energy.

== Education ==
Clark received a bachelor's degree in chemistry from Lander College in 1989, a master's degree in inorganic chemistry from the Florida State University in 1987, and a doctorate also in inorganic and radiochemistry also from Florida State University in 1989.

== Career ==
Clark is a Regents Distinguished Professor of Chemistry and has previously worked at Washington State University at Pullman, and currently holds the position of Battelle Fellow in the Energy and Environment Directorate with Pacific Northwest National Laboratory, where she leads research on the chemistry and chemical engineering of processing nuclear materials.

Sue began her academic career at Washington State University in the chemistry department in 1996, where she worked as an assistant professor and served as department chair from August 2005 to December 2007.

She has also served as interim vice chancellor for academic affairs at WSU's Tri-Cities Campus from January 2008 to August 2008 and as interim dean of the college of sciences from July to December 2010.

Clark was appointed to the US Nuclear Waste Technical Review Board by former president Barack Obama and held the position from 2011 to 2014. She also served as an elected member of Washington State Academy of Sciences and the governing board for the US Council for Chemical Research from 2009 to 2011.

She was also a member of the National Academy's Nuclear and Radiation Studies Board from 2004 to 2009, and was a member of various study committees introduced by the board.

From 2003 to 2011 Sue was on the Basic Energy Sciences Advisory Committee for the US Department of Energy and served as a consultant to Battelle Memorial Institute and the Helmholtz Association of German Research Centers.

Clark is also involved in international service activities, serving as a consultant to the Nuclear Energy Agency of France, the Korean Atomic Energy Research Institute, and the Battelle Memorial Institute.

Clark has published more than 120 peer-reviewed papers, the majority of which are focused on actinides in the environment, chemistry of high-level radioactive waste systems, and radio-analytical chemistry.

== Honours and awards ==
- 1998-1999 - The Young Faculty Achievement Award in the College of Sciences at Washington State University
- 1998-2000 - The Edward R. Meyer Distinguished Professor of Chemistry
- 2002-2008 - The Westinghouse Distinguished Professor of Material Sciences and Engineering, WSU
- 2003 - The Ford Lecturer at Minnesota State University
- 2008 - Fink Distinguished Lecturer, Georgia Institute of Technology's Department of Chemistry
- 2012 - The Garvan-Olin Medal for her research activities and advocacy for advancing women chemists
- 2020 - American Chemical Society, Glenn T. Seaborg Award for Nuclear Chemistry

Clark is also fellow of the American Association for the Advancement of Science (AAAS), the American Association for the Advancement of Science, Sigma Xi, the Scientific Research Society, and the American Chemical Society (ACS).
