= Glenn T. Seaborg bibliography =

Nobel Prize–winning chemist Glenn T. Seaborg ranked among the most prolific authors in scientific history. With some 50 books, 500 scientific journal articles, hundreds of published speeches, and a lifelong daily journal, a massive volume of written material is available in the Glenn T. Seaborg bibliography with a partial listing given below. Seaborg frequently collaborated with other scientists, co-authors, and staff members to achieve the productivity for which he was so well known. Although most of his writing was in the field of nuclear chemistry, history of science, science education, and science public policy, he has also collaborated on works in sports and collegiate history.

== Partial list of books and other major publications by Glenn T. Seaborg ==
- Plutonium and Other Transuranium Elements (Washington, D.C.: U.S. Government Printing Office, 1948).
- The New Element Americium (Atomic Number 95) (Washington, D.C.: U.S. Atomic Energy Commission, 1948).
- The New Element Curium (Atomic Number 96) (Washington, D.C.: U.S. Atomic Energy Commission, 1948).
- The New Element Berkelium (Atomic Number 97), Stanley Thompson, Albert Ghiorso and Glenn T. Seaborg (Berkeley, California: University of California, Berkeley Radiation Laboratory, 1950).
- The New Element Californium (Atomic Number 98), Seaborg, Glenn T.; Thompson, S.G.; Street, K. Jr.; Ghiroso, Albert (Berkeley, California: University of California, Berkeley Radiation Laboratory, 1950).
- The Transuranium Elements – Present Status: Nobel Lecture (Berkeley, California: University of California, Berkeley Radiation Laboratory, 1951).
- Chemical Properties of Elements 99 and 100 (Einsteinium and Fermium), Seaborg, Glenn T., Thompson, Stanley G., Harvey, B.G., Choppin, G.R. (Berkeley, California: University of California, Berkeley Radiation Laboratory, 1954).
- The Actinide Elements (with Joseph Katz) (McGraw-Hill, 1954).
- Chemistry Creates a New World, Jaffe, Bernard, introduction by Glenn T. Seaborg (New York, N.Y.: Thomas Y. Crowell Company, 1957).
- Elements of the Universe (New York, N.Y.: E.P. Dutton & Company, 1958).
- The Transuranium Elements (New Haven, Connecticut: Yale University Press, 1958).
- Man Made Transuranium Elements (Englewood Cliffs, New Jersey: Prentice Hall, 1963).
- Nuclear Properties of the Heavy Elements. I Systematics of Nuclear Structure and Radioactivity, Hyde, Earl K., Isadore Perlman, and Glenn T. Seaborg (New York, N.Y.: Dover Publications, 1964).
- Education and the Atom, Glenn T. Seaborg and Daniel M. Wilkes (New York, N.Y.: McGraw-Hill, 1964).
- Otto Hahn: A Scientific Autobiography, Hahn, Otto; translated & edited by Willy Ley, Introduction by Glenn T. Seaborg (New York, N.Y.: Charles Scribner & Sons, 1966).
- The First Weighing of Plutonium (Washington, D.C.: U.S. Atomic Energy Commission, Division of Technical Information, 1967).
- Oppenheimer, I.I. Rabi, Robert Serber, Victor Weisskopf, Abraham Pais, Glenn T. Seaborg (New York, N.Y.: Scribner's Sons, 1969).
- Peaceful Uses of Nuclear Energy, Glenn T. Seaborg and U. S. Atomic Energy Commission (Washington, D.C.: U.S. Atomic Energy Commission, Division of Technical Information, 1970). Reprinted 2005 by University Press of the Pacific. ISBN 1-4102-2069-9.
- Man and Atom: Building a New World Through Nuclear Technology (New York, N.Y.: E.P. Dutton & Company, 1971). ISBN 0-525-15099-4.
- Nuclear Milestones (San Francisco: W. H. Freeman, 1972).
- Element 106 (Seaborgium), A. Ghiorso, J. M. Nitschke, J. R. Alonso, C. T. Alonso, M. Nurmia, G. T. Seaborg, E. K. Hulet and R. W. Lougheed, Phys. Rev. Lett. Vol. 33, Issue 25: 1490–1493; December 16, 1974.
- Transuranium Elements. Products of Modern Alchemy. Benchmark Papers in Physical Chemistry and Chemical Physics. Vol. 1., edited by Glenn T. Seaborg (Stroudsburg, Pennsylvania: Dowden, Hutchinson & Ross, 1978).
- Symposium Commemorating the 25th Anniversary of the Discovery of Mendelevium (Atomic Number 101), Seaborg, Glenn T. (editor) (Berkeley, California: Lawrence Berkeley Laboratory, 1980).
- Kennedy, Khrushchev, and the Test Ban (with Benjamin S. Loeb) (University of California Press, 1981).
- Nuclear Chemistry (New York City: Van Nostrand Rheinhold, 1982). ISBN 0-87933-422-3.
- The Central Science Essays on the Uses of Chemistry, George B. And H. Harry Szmont, introduction by Glenn T. Seaborg (Fort Worth, Texas: Texas Christian University, 1985). ISBN 0-912646-84-5.
- The Chemistry of the Actinides, 2nd ed., J.J. Katz, G.T. Seaborg & L.R. Morss (London: Chapman & Hall, 1986).
- Stemming the Tide: Arms Control in the Johnson Years (with Benjamin S. Loeb) (Lexington, Massachusetts: Lexington Books, 1987).
- The Elements Beyond Uranium, Glenn T. Seaborg and Walter D. Loveland (Hoboken, New Jersey: Wiley Interscience, 1990). ISBN 0-471-89062-6.
- Transuranium Elements: a Half Century (Berkeley, California: Lawrence Berkeley Laboratory, 1990).
- Journal of Glenn T. Seaborg, 1946-1958. Volume 3. January 1, 1949 - December 31, 1949 (Berkeley, California: Lawrence Berkeley Laboratory, University of California, 1990).
- Journal of Glenn T. Seaborg, 1946-1958. Volume 4. January 1, 1950 - December 31, 1950 (Berkeley, California: Lawrence Berkeley Laboratory, University of California, 1990).
- The Atomic Energy Commission under Nixon: Adjusting to Troubled Times (New York: St. Martin's Press, 1993).
- Modern Alchemy: Selected Papers of Glenn T. Seaborg, World Scientific Series in 20th Century Chemistry, Vol. 2 (Hackensack, New Jersey: World Scientific Publishing Company, 1994).
- The Plutonium Story: Journals of Professor Glenn T. Seaborg, 1939–1946 (Columbus, Ohio: Battelle Press, 1994).
- America the Powerless, Facing Our Nuclear Energy Dilemma, Waltar, Alan E., foreword by Glenn T. Seaborg (Madison, Wisconsin: Cogito Books, 1995). ISBN 0-944838-58-8.
- A Scientist Speaks Out: A Personal Perspective on Science, Society and Change (Hackensack, New Jersey: World Scientific Publishing Company, 1996). ISBN 981-02-2204-1.
- Opportunities in Chemistry Careers, John H. Woodburn, foreword by Glenn T. Seaborg (Chicago, Illinois: NTC/Contemporary Publishing Company, 1996).
- A Chemist in the White House: From the Manhattan Project to the End of the Cold War (Washington, D.C.: American Chemical Society, 1996).
- The Transuranium People: The Inside Story, Darleane C. Hoffman, Albert Ghiorso, Glenn T. Seaborg (editor) (Hackensack, New Jersey: World Scientific Publishing Company, 2000). ISBN 1-86094-087-0.
- Chancellor at Berkeley, Glenn T. Seaborg and Ray Colvig (Berkeley, California: University of California Institute, 2000). ISBN 0-87772-343-5.
- Roses from the Ashes: Breakup and Rebirth in Pacific Coast Intercollegiate Athletics, Glenn T. Seaborg and Ray Colvig (Berkeley, California: University of California Institute, 2000). ISBN 0-87772-394-X.
- Adventures in the Atomic Age: From Watts to Washington (with son Eric Seaborg) (Farrar, Straus and Giroux, 2001). ISBN 0-374-29991-9.
- Modern Nuclear Chemistry, Walter D. Loveland, David Morrissey, Glenn T. Seaborg (Hoboken, New Jersey: John Wiley and Sons, 2006). ISBN 0-471-11532-0.
