= Gilbert N. Lewis =

American physical chemist (1875–1946)

- Born: October 23 or 25, 1875; Weymouth, Massachusetts, US
- Died: March 23, 1946 (aged 70); Berkeley, California, US
- Education: Harvard University
- Known for: Lewis pair Lewis structures Lewis acids and bases Lewis–Tolman paradox Chemical thermodynamics Valence bond theory Covalent bond Cubical atom Fugacity; Heavy water Ionic strength Octet rule Tetraoxygen; Thermodynamic activity Named photon Explained phosphorescence
- Awards: Foreign Member of the Royal Society; William H. Nichols Medal (1921); Willard Gibbs Award (1924); Davy Medal (1929)
- Scientific career
- Fields: Physical chemistry
- Thesis: A general equation for free energy and physico-chemical equilibrium, and its application (1899)
- Doctoral advisor: Theodore William Richards
- Doctoral students: Michael Kasha; Harold Urey; Glenn T. Seaborg; Joseph Edward Mayer

Gilbert Newton Lewis (October 23 or October 25, 1875 – March 23, 1946) was an American physical chemist and a dean of the college of chemistry at University of California, Berkeley. Lewis was best known for his discovery of the covalent bond and his concept of electron pairs; his Lewis dot structures and other contributions to valence bond theory have shaped modern theories of chemical bonding. Lewis successfully contributed to chemical thermodynamics, photochemistry, and isotope separation, and is also known for his concept of acids and bases. Lewis also researched on relativity and quantum physics, and in 1926 he coined the term "photon" for the smallest unit of radiant energy.

G. N. Lewis was born in 1875 in Weymouth, Massachusetts. After receiving his PhD in chemistry from Harvard University and studying abroad in Germany and the Philippines, Lewis moved to California in 1912 to teach chemistry at the University of California, Berkeley, where he became the dean of the college of chemistry and spent the rest of his life. As a professor, he incorporated thermodynamic principles into the chemistry curriculum and reformed chemical thermodynamics in a mathematically rigorous manner accessible to ordinary chemists. He began measuring the free energy values related to several chemical processes, both organic and inorganic. In 1916, he also proposed his theory of bonding and added information about electrons in the periodic table of the chemical elements. In 1933, he started his research on isotope separation. Lewis worked with hydrogen and managed to purify a sample of heavy water. He then came up with his theory of acids and bases, and did work in photochemistry during the last years of his life.

Though he was nominated 41 times, G. N. Lewis never won the Nobel Prize in Chemistry, resulting in a major Nobel Prize controversy. On the other hand, Lewis mentored and influenced numerous Nobel laureates at Berkeley including Harold Urey (1934 Nobel Prize), William F. Giauque (1949 Nobel Prize), Glenn T. Seaborg (1951 Nobel Prize), Willard Libby (1960 Nobel Prize), Melvin Calvin (1961 Nobel Prize) and so on, turning Berkeley into one of the world's most prestigious centers for chemistry. On March 23, 1946, Lewis was found dead in his Berkeley laboratory where he had been working with hydrogen cyanide; many postulated that the cause of his death was suicide. After Lewis' death, his children followed their father's career in chemistry, and the Lewis Hall on the Berkeley campus is named after him.

== Biography ==
=== Early life ===
Lewis was born in 1875 and raised in Weymouth, Massachusetts, where there exists a street named for him, G.N. Lewis Way, off Summer Street. Additionally, the wing of the new Weymouth High School Chemistry department has been named in his honor. Lewis received his primary education at home from his parents, Frank Wesley Lewis, a lawyer of independent character, and Mary Burr White Lewis. He read at age three and was intellectually precocious. In 1884 his family moved to Lincoln, Nebraska, and in 1889 he received his first formal education at the university preparatory school.

In 1893, after two years at the University of Nebraska, Lewis transferred to Harvard University, where he obtained his B.S. in 1896. After a year of teaching at Phillips Academy in Andover, Lewis returned to Harvard to study with the physical chemist T. W. Richards and obtained his Ph.D. in 1899 with a dissertation on electrochemical potentials. After a year of teaching at Harvard, Lewis took a traveling fellowship to Germany, the center of physical chemistry, and studied with Walther Nernst at Göttingen and with Wilhelm Ostwald at Leipzig. While working in Nernst's lab, Lewis apparently developed a lifelong enmity with Nernst. In the following years, Lewis started to criticize and denounce his former teacher on many occasions, calling Nernst's work on his heat theorem "a regrettable episode in the history of chemistry". A Swedish friend of Nernst's, Wilhelm Palmær, was a member of the Nobel Chemistry Committee. There is evidence that he used the Nobel nominating and reporting procedures to block a Nobel Prize for Lewis in thermodynamics by nominating Lewis for the prize three times, and then using his position as a committee member to write negative reports.

=== Harvard, Manila, and MIT ===
After his stay in Nernst's lab, Lewis returned to Harvard in 1901 as an instructor for three more years. He was appointed instructor in thermodynamics and electrochemistry. In 1904, Lewis was granted a leave of absence and became Superintendent of Weights and Measures for the Bureau of Science in Manila, Philippines. The next year he returned to Cambridge, Massachusetts when the Massachusetts Institute of Technology (MIT) appointed him to a faculty position, in which he had a chance to join a group of outstanding physical chemists under the direction of Arthur Amos Noyes. He became an assistant professor in 1907, associate professor in 1908, and full professor in 1911.

=== University of California, Berkeley ===
G. N. Lewis left MIT in 1912 to become a professor of physical chemistry and dean of the College of Chemistry at the University of California, Berkeley. On June 21, 1912, he married Mary Hinckley Sheldon, daughter of a Harvard professor of Romance languages. They had two sons, both of whom became chemistry professors, and a daughter. In 1913, he joined the Alpha Chi Sigma at Berkeley, the professional chemistry fraternity.

Lewis' graduate advisees at Berkeley went on to be exceptionally successful with the Nobel Committee. 14 Nobel prizes were eventually awarded to the men he took as students. The best-known of these include Harold Urey (1934 Nobel Prize), William F. Giauque (1949 Nobel Prize), Glenn T. Seaborg (1951 Nobel Prize), Willard Libby (1960 Nobel Prize), Melvin Calvin (1961 Nobel Prize). Due to his efforts, the college of chemistry at Berkeley became one of the top chemistry centers in the world.

While at Berkeley he also refused entry to women, including preventing Margaret Melhase from conducting graduate studies. Melhase had previously co-discovered Cesium-137 with Seaborg as an undergraduate. In 1913, he was elected to the National Academy of Sciences. He was elected to the American Philosophical Society in 1918. He resigned in 1934, refusing to state the cause for his resignation; it has been speculated that it was due to a dispute over the internal politics of that institution or to the failure of those he had nominated to be elected. His decision to resign may also have been sparked by his resentment over the award of the 1934 Nobel Prize for chemistry to his student, Harold Urey, for his 1931 isolation of deuterium and the confirmation of its spectrum. This was a prize Lewis almost certainly felt he should have shared for his efforts to purify and characterize heavy water.

== Death ==
On 23 March 1946, a graduate student found Lewis's lifeless body under a laboratory workbench at Berkeley. Lewis had been working on an experiment with liquid hydrogen cyanide, and deadly fumes from a broken line had leaked into the laboratory. The coroner ruled that the cause of death was coronary artery disease, because of a lack of any signs of cyanosis, but some believe that it may have been a suicide. Berkeley Emeritus Professor William Jolly, who reported the various views on Lewis's death in his 1987 history of UC Berkeley's College of Chemistry, From Retorts to Lasers, wrote that a higher-up in the department believed that Lewis had committed suicide.

If Lewis's death was indeed a suicide, a possible explanation was depression brought on by a lunch with Irving Langmuir. Langmuir and Lewis had a long rivalry, dating back to Langmuir's extensions of Lewis's theory of the chemical bond. Langmuir had been awarded the 1932 Nobel Prize in chemistry for his work on surface chemistry, while Lewis had not received the Prize despite having been nominated 41 times. On the day of Lewis's death, Langmuir and Lewis had met for lunch at Berkeley, a meeting that Michael Kasha recalled only years later. Associates reported that Lewis came back from lunch in a dark mood, played a morose game of bridge with some colleagues, then went back to work in his lab. An hour later, he was found dead. Langmuir's papers at the Library of Congress confirm that he had been on the Berkeley campus that day to receive an honorary degree.

Lewis Hall at Berkeley, built in 1948, is named in his honor.

== Scientific achievements ==
=== Thermodynamics ===
Most of Lewis’ lasting interests originated during his Harvard years. The most important was thermodynamics, a subject in which his doctoral advisor Richards was very active at that time. Although most of the important thermodynamic relations were known by 1895, they were seen as isolated equations, and had not yet been rationalized as a logical system, from which, given one relation, the rest could be derived. Moreover, these relations were inexact, applying only to ideal chemical systems. These were two outstanding problems of theoretical thermodynamics. In two long and ambitious theoretical papers in 1900 and 1901, Lewis tried to provide a solution. Lewis introduced the thermodynamic concept of activity and coined the term "fugacity". His new idea of fugacity, or "escaping tendency", was a function with the dimensions of pressure which expressed the tendency of a substance to pass from one chemical phase to another. Lewis believed that fugacity was the fundamental principle from which a system of real thermodynamic relations could be derived. This hope was not realized, though fugacity did find a lasting place in the description of real gases.

Lewis’ early papers also reveal an unusually advanced awareness of J. W. Gibbs's and P. Duhem's ideas of free energy and thermodynamic potential. These ideas were well known to physicists and mathematicians, but not to most practical chemists, who regarded them as abstruse and inapplicable to chemical systems. Most chemists relied on the familiar thermodynamics of heat (enthalpy) of Berthelot, Ostwald, and Van ’t Hoff, and the calorimetric school. Heat of reaction is not, of course, a measure of the tendency of chemical changes to occur, and Lewis realized that only free energy and entropy could provide an exact chemical thermodynamics. He derived free energy from fugacity; he tried, without success, to obtain an exact expression for the entropy function, which in 1901 had not been defined at low temperatures. Richards too tried and failed, and not until Nernst succeeded in 1907 was it possible to calculate entropies unambiguously. Although Lewis’ fugacity-based system did not last, his early interest in free energy and entropy proved most fruitful, and much of his career was devoted to making these useful concepts accessible to practical chemists.

At Harvard, Lewis also wrote a theoretical paper on the thermodynamics of blackbody radiation in which he postulated that light has a pressure. He later revealed that he had been discouraged from pursuing this idea by his older, more conservative colleagues, who were unaware that Wilhelm Wien and others were successfully pursuing the same line of thought. Lewis’ paper remained unpublished; but his interest in radiation and quantum theory, and (later) in relativity, sprang from this early, aborted effort. From the start of his career, Lewis regarded himself as both chemist and physicist.

=== Valence theory ===
Lewis' cubical atoms (as drawn in 1902)

About 1902 Lewis started to use unpublished drawings of cubical atoms in his lecture notes, in which the corners of the cube represented possible electron positions. Lewis later cited these notes in his classic 1916 paper on chemical bonding, as being the first expression of his ideas.

A third major interest that originated during Lewis’ Harvard years was his valence theory. In 1902, while trying to explain the laws of valence to his students, Lewis conceived the idea that atoms were built up of a concentric series of cubes with electrons at each corner. This “cubic atom” explained the cycle of eight elements in the periodic table and was in accord with the widely accepted belief that chemical bonds were formed by transfer of electrons to give each atom a complete set of eight. This electrochemical theory of valence found its most elaborate expression in the work of Richard Abegg in 1904, but Lewis’ version of this theory was the only one to be embodied in a concrete atomic model. Again Lewis’ theory did not interest his Harvard mentors, who, like most American chemists of that time, had no taste for such speculation. Lewis did not publish his theory of the cubic atom, but in 1916 it became an important part of his theory of the shared electron pair bond.

In 1916, he published his classic paper on chemical bonding "The Atom and the Molecule" in which he formulated the idea of what would become known as the covalent bond, consisting of a shared pair of electrons, and he defined the term odd molecule (the modern term is free radical) when an electron is not shared. He included what became known as Lewis dot structures as well as the cubical atom model. These ideas on chemical bonding were expanded upon by Irving Langmuir and became the inspiration for the studies on the nature of the chemical bond by Linus Pauling.

=== Acids and bases ===
In 1923, he formulated the electron-pair theory of acid–base reactions. In this theory of acids and bases, a "Lewis acid" is an electron-pair acceptor and a "Lewis base" is an electron-pair donor. This year he also published a monograph on his theories of the chemical bond.

Based on work by J. Willard Gibbs, it was known that chemical reactions proceeded to an equilibrium determined by the free energy of the substances taking part. Lewis spent 25 years determining free energies of various substances. In 1923 he and Merle Randall published the results of this study, which helped formalize modern chemical thermodynamics.

=== Heavy water ===
Lewis was the first to produce a pure sample of deuterium oxide (heavy water) in 1933 and the first to study survival and growth of life forms in heavy water. By accelerating deuterons (deuterium nuclei) in Ernest O. Lawrence's cyclotron, he was able to study many of the properties of atomic nuclei. During the 1930s, he was mentor to Glenn T. Seaborg, who was retained for post-doctoral work as Lewis' personal research assistant. Seaborg went on to win the 1951 Nobel Prize in Chemistry and have the element seaborgium named in his honor while he was still alive.

=== O_{4} Tetraoxygen ===
In 1924, by studying the magnetic properties of solutions of oxygen in liquid nitrogen, Lewis found that O_{4} molecules were formed. This was the first evidence for tetratomic oxygen.

=== Relativity and quantum physics ===
In 1908, he published the first of several papers on relativity, in which he derived the mass-energy relationship in a different way from Albert Einstein's derivation. In 1909, he and Richard C. Tolman combined his methods with special relativity. In 1912 Lewis and Edwin Bidwell Wilson presented a major work in mathematical physics that not only applied synthetic geometry to the study of spacetime, but also noted the identity of a spacetime squeeze mapping and a Lorentz transformation.

In 1926, he coined the term "photon" for the smallest unit of radiant energy (light). Actually, the outcome of his letter to Nature was not what he had intended. In the letter, he proposed a photon being a structural element, not energy. He insisted on the need for a new variable, the number of photons. Although his theory differed from the quantum theory of light introduced by Albert Einstein in 1905, his name was adopted for what Einstein had called a light quantum (Lichtquant in German).

=== Other achievements ===
In 1921, Lewis was the first to propose an empirical equation describing the failure of strong electrolytes to obey the law of mass action, a problem that had perplexed physical chemists for twenty years. His empirical equations for what he called ionic strength were later confirmed to be in accord with the Debye–Hückel equation for strong electrolytes, published in 1923.

Over the course of his career, Lewis published on many other subjects besides those mentioned in this entry, ranging from the nature of light quanta to the economics of price stabilization. In the last years of his life, Lewis and graduate student Michael Kasha, his last research associate, established that phosphorescence of organic molecules involves emission of light from one electron in an excited triplet state (a state in which two electrons have their spin vectors oriented in the same direction, but in different orbitals) and measured the paramagnetism of this triplet state.

== See also ==
- History of molecular theory

== Sources ==
- Coffey, Patrick (2008). Cathedrals of Science : The Personalities and Rivalries That Made Modern Chemistry. doi:10.1093/oso/9780195321340.001.0001. ISBN 978-0-19-532134-0. OCLC 265732288.
