= Seaborg Home =

Coordinates: 33.95020°N 118.20577°W

Seaborg Home in 2026

The Seaborg Home was the family home of Nobel Prize–winning chemist and nuclear pioneer, Glenn T. Seaborg from 1922 to 1934. Herman Theodore (Ted) and Selma Olivia (Erickson) Seaborg moved at Selma's urging from Ishpeming, Michigan in 1922 with their children Glenn Theodore Seaborg and Jeanette (Seaborg) Bonniksen to Home Gardens, California. The family purchased a home on 9237 San Antonio Avenue in an area of Home Gardens, later annexed to the city of South Gate, California. H. Theodore and Selma Seaborg lived in the home until their deaths in 1957 and 1968 respectively.

While living in the home, Glenn Seaborg attended Home Gardens Grammar School (now Victoria Avenue Elementary School), David Starr Jordan High School, and the University of California, Los Angeles. At the age of 14, Seaborg began keeping a daily journal. These journals have since been published in several volumes and contain considerable detail about Seaborg's early life in the home. Seaborg helped work his way through school with jobs as a stevedore and fruit packer. He also gained employment on the graveyard shift as a laboratory assistant at the Firestone Tire and Rubber Company in South Gate.

After Seaborg moved to northern California to attend the University of California, Berkeley, he and his wife, Helen L. Seaborg, continued to make numerous visits to see his parents throughout their lifetimes, all of which are noted in his journals.

The Seaborg Home is a typical small single family residence of the period, notable primarily for its famous resident. In January 2000, the City of South Gate designated the Seaborg family home on San Antonio Avenue as a "culturally significant landmark" and named a street in the Civic Center "Dr. Glenn T. Seaborg Way." Following Community Redevelopment Agency staff recommendations to move the home to the Civic Center, it has been relocated along Dr. Glenn T. Seaborg Way and opened as an historical museum.
