= Glenn T. Seaborg =

American chemist (1912–1999)

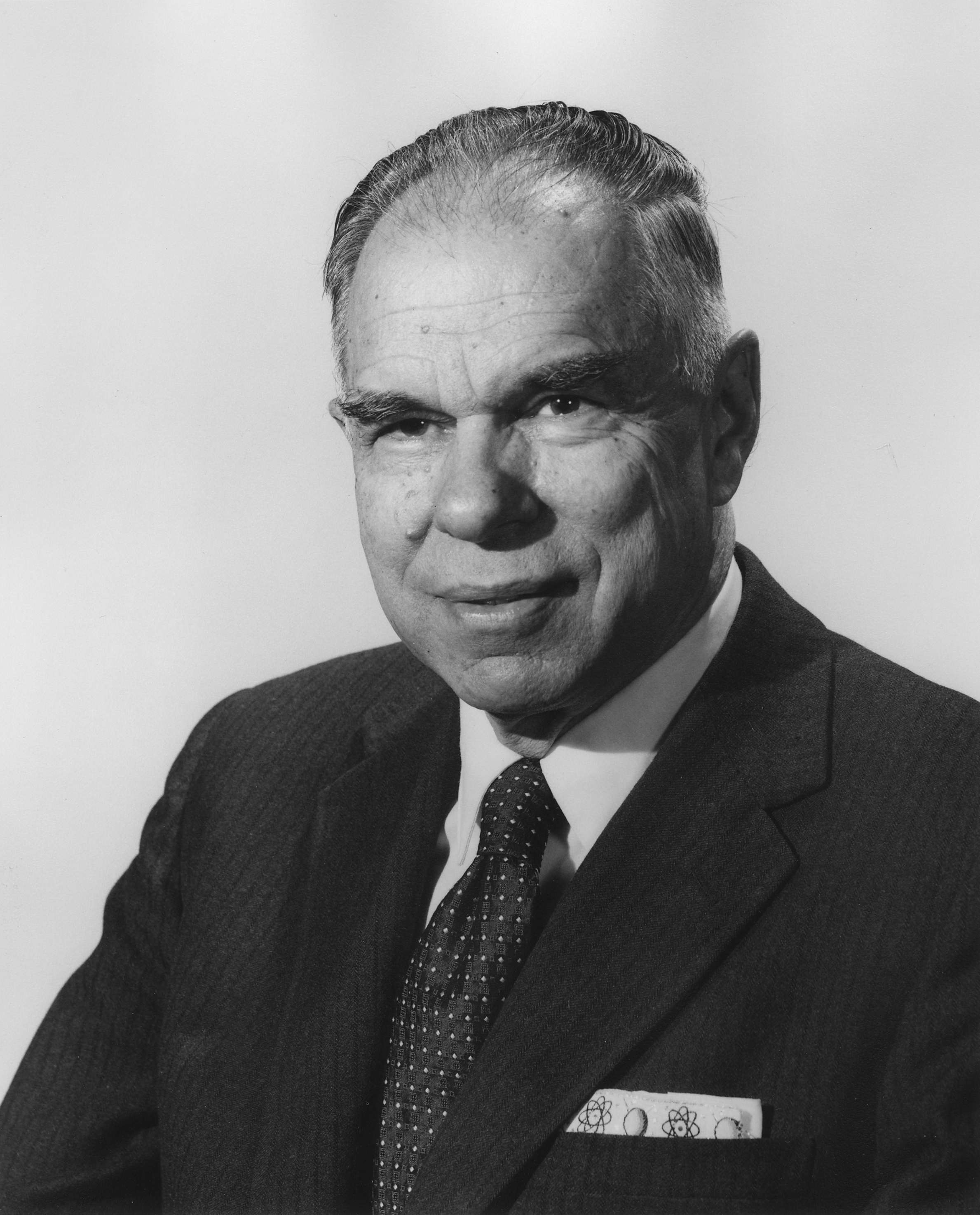
- Seaborg in 1964
- Born: Glen Theodore Seaborg; April 19, 1912; Ishpeming, Michigan, U.S.
- Died: February 25, 1999 (aged 86); Lafayette, California, U.S.
- Education: University of California, Los Angeles (BA); University of California, Berkeley (MA, PhD)
- Known for: Contributions to the synthesis, discovery and investigation of ten transuranium elements
- Spouse: Helen Griggs (m. 1942)
- Children: 7, including David
- Awards: ACS Award in Pure Chemistry (1947); Member of the National Academy of Sciences (1948); Nobel Prize in Chemistry (1951); Centenary Prize (1956); Perkin Medal (1957); Enrico Fermi Award (1959); Franklin Medal (1963); Willard Gibbs Award (1966); Priestley Medal (1979); Foreign Member of the Royal Society (1985); Vannevar Bush Award (1988); National Medal of Science (1991)
- Scientific career
- Fields: Nuclear chemistry
- Workplaces: University of California, Berkeley; University of Chicago; Manhattan Project; Atomic Energy Commission
- Thesis: The Interaction of Fast Neutrons with Lead (1937)
- Doctoral advisors: George Ernest Gibson; Gilbert Newton Lewis
- Doctoral students: Ralph James; Joe Kennedy; Elizabeth Rauscher; Arthur Wahl
- Other notable students: Margaret Melhase; Geoffrey Wilkinson

Chair of the Atomic Energy Commission
- In office March 1, 1961 – August 16, 1971
- President: John F. Kennedy; Lyndon B. Johnson; Richard Nixon
- Preceded by: John McCone
- Succeeded by: James R. Schlesinger

2nd Chancellor of the University of California, Berkeley
- In office 1958–1961
- Preceded by: Clark Kerr
- Succeeded by: Edward W. Strong

Glenn Theodore Seaborg (/ˈsiːbɔːrɡ/ SEE-borg; April 19, 1912 – February 25, 1999) was an American chemist whose involvement in the synthesis, discovery and investigation of ten transuranium elements earned him a share of the 1951 Nobel Prize in Chemistry. His work in this area also led to his development of the actinide concept and the arrangement of the actinide series in the periodic table of the elements.

Seaborg spent most of his career as an educator and research scientist at the University of California, Berkeley, serving as a professor, and, between 1958 and 1961, as the university's second chancellor. He advised ten US presidents—from Harry S. Truman to Bill Clinton—on nuclear policy and was Chairman of the United States Atomic Energy Commission from 1961 to 1971, where he pushed for commercial nuclear energy and the peaceful applications of nuclear science. Throughout his career, Seaborg worked for arms control. He was a signatory to the Franck Report and contributed to the Limited Test Ban Treaty, the Nuclear Non-Proliferation Treaty and the Comprehensive Test Ban Treaty. He was a well-known advocate of science education and federal funding for pure research. Toward the end of the Eisenhower administration, he was the principal author of the Seaborg Report on academic science, and, as a member of President Ronald Reagan's National Commission on Excellence in Education, he was a key contributor to its 1983 report "A Nation at Risk".

Seaborg was the principal or co-discoverer of ten elements: plutonium, americium, curium, berkelium, californium, einsteinium, fermium, mendelevium, nobelium and element 106, then called unnilhexium, which while he was still living, was named seaborgium in his honor. He said about this naming, "This is the greatest honor ever bestowed upon me—even better, I think, than winning the Nobel Prize. Future students of chemistry, in learning about the periodic table, may have reason to ask why the element was named for me, and thereby learn more about my work." He also discovered more than 100 isotopes of transuranium elements and is credited with important contributions to the chemistry of plutonium, originally as part of the Manhattan Project where he developed the extraction process used to isolate the plutonium fuel for the implosion-type atomic bomb. Early in his career, he was a pioneer in nuclear medicine and discovered isotopes of elements with important applications in the diagnosis and treatment of diseases, including iodine-131, which is used in the treatment of thyroid disease. In addition to his theoretical work in the development of the actinide concept, which placed the actinide series beneath the lanthanide series on the periodic table, he postulated the existence of super-heavy elements in the transactinide and superactinide series.

After sharing the 1951 Nobel Prize in Chemistry with Edwin McMillan, he received approximately 50 honorary doctorates and numerous other awards and honors. The list of things named after Seaborg ranges from the chemical element seaborgium to the asteroid 4856 Seaborg. He was the author of numerous books and 500 journal articles, often in collaboration with others. He was once listed in the Guinness Book of World Records as the person with the longest entry in Who's Who in America.

== Early life ==
Seaborg was born Glen Theodore Erickson Seaborg in Ishpeming, Michigan, on April 19, 1912, the son of Herman Theodore (Ted) Seaborg and Selma Olivia Erickson Seaborg. He had one sister, Jeanette, who was two years younger. His family spoke Swedish at home. When Seaborg was a boy, the family moved to Los Angeles County, California, settling in a subdivision called Home Gardens, later annexed to the City of South Gate, California. At the age of 11, he changed the spelling of his first name from Glen to Glenn.

Seaborg kept a daily journal from 1927 until he suffered a stroke in 1998. As a youth, Seaborg was both a devoted sports fan and an avid movie buff. His mother encouraged him to become a bookkeeper as she felt his literary interests were impractical. He did not take an interest in science until his junior year when he was inspired by Dwight Logan Reid, a chemistry and physics teacher at David Starr Jordan High School in Watts.

Seaborg graduated from Jordan in 1929 at the top of his class and received a Bachelor of Arts (BA) degree in chemistry at the University of California, Los Angeles, in 1933. He worked his way through school as a stevedore and a laboratory assistant at Firestone. Seaborg received his PhD in chemistry at the University of California, Berkeley, in 1937 with a doctoral thesis on the "Interaction of Fast Neutrons with Lead", in which he coined the term "nuclear spallation".

Seaborg was a member of the professional chemistry fraternity Alpha Chi Sigma. As a graduate student in the 1930s Seaborg performed wet chemistry research for his advisor Gilbert Newton Lewis, and published three papers with him on the theory of acids and bases. Seaborg studied the text Applied Radiochemistry by Otto Hahn, of the Kaiser Wilhelm Institute for Chemistry in Berlin, and it had a major impact on his developing interests as a research scientist. For several years, Seaborg conducted important research in artificial radioactivity using the Lawrence cyclotron at UC Berkeley. He was excited to learn from others that nuclear fission was possible—but also chagrined, as his own research might have led him to the same discovery.

Seaborg also became an adept interlocutor of Berkeley physicist Robert Oppenheimer. Oppenheimer had a daunting reputation and often answered a junior colleague's question before it had even been stated. Often the question answered was more profound than the one asked, but of little practical help. Seaborg learned to state his questions to Oppenheimer quickly and succinctly.

== Pioneering work in nuclear chemistry ==
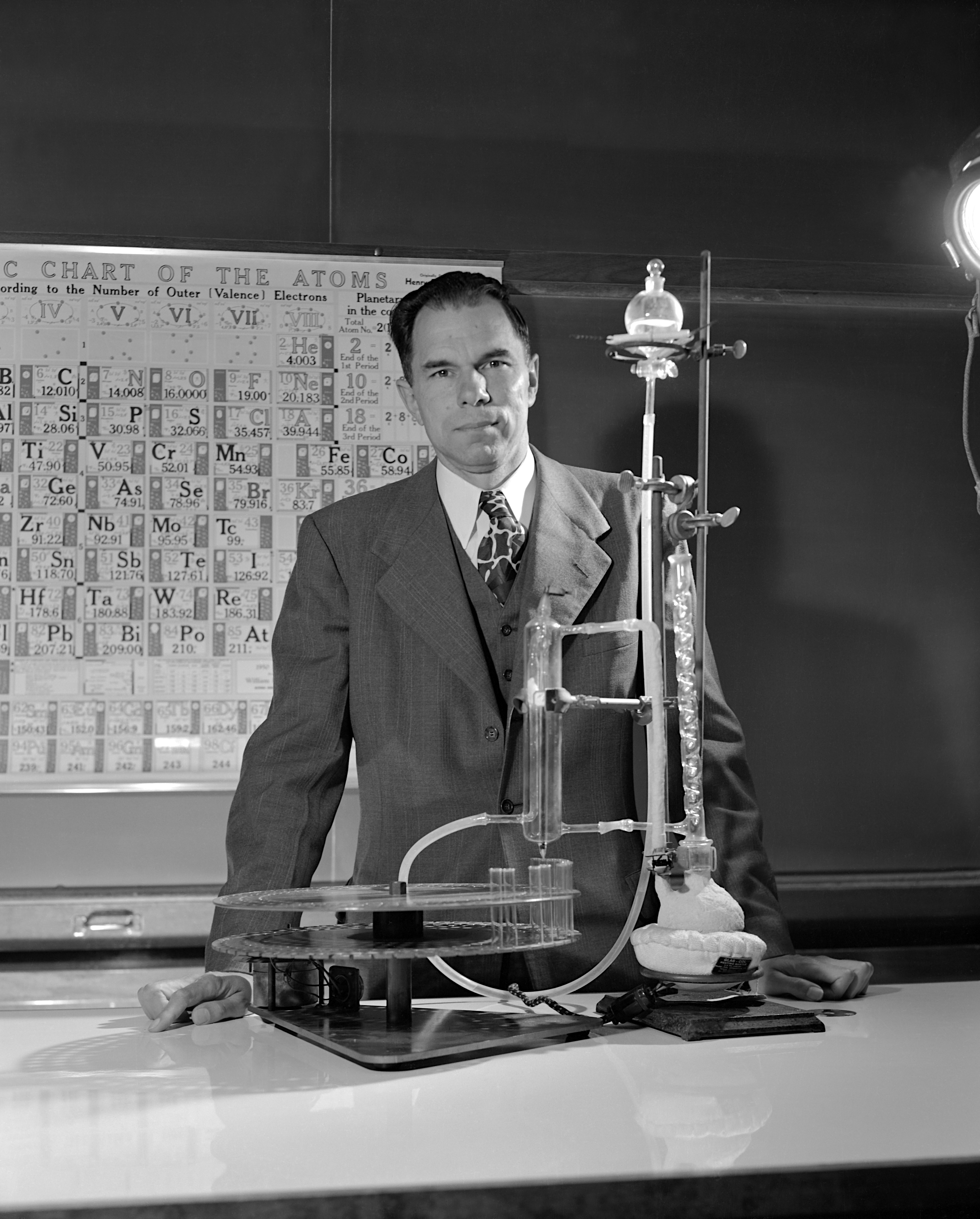
Seaborg in 1950, with the ion exchanger elution column of actinide elements

Seaborg remained at the University of California, Berkeley, for post-doctoral research. He followed Frederick Soddy's work investigating isotopes and contributed to the discovery of more than 100 isotopes of elements. Using one of Lawrence's advanced cyclotrons, John Livingood, Fred Fairbrother, and Seaborg created a new isotope of iron, iron-59 in 1937. Iron-59 was useful in the studies of the hemoglobin in human blood. In 1938, Livingood and Seaborg collaborated (as they did for five years) to create an important isotope of iodine, iodine-131, which is still used to treat thyroid disease. (Many years later, it was credited with prolonging the life of Seaborg's mother.) As a result of these and other contributions, Seaborg is regarded as a pioneer in nuclear medicine and is one of its most prolific discoverers of isotopes.

In 1939 he became an instructor in chemistry at Berkeley, was promoted to assistant professor in 1941 and professor in 1945. University of California, Berkeley, physicist Edwin McMillan led a team that discovered element 93, which he named neptunium in 1940. In November, he was persuaded to leave Berkeley temporarily to assist with urgent research in radar technology. Since Seaborg and his colleagues had perfected McMillan's oxidation-reduction technique for isolating neptunium, he asked McMillan for permission to continue the research and search for element 94. McMillan agreed to the collaboration. Seaborg first reported alpha decay proportionate to only a fraction of the element 93 under observation. The first hypothesis for this alpha particle accumulation was contamination by uranium, which produces alpha-decay particles; analysis of alpha-decay particles ruled this out. Seaborg then postulated that a distinct alpha-producing element was being formed from element 93.

In February 1941, Seaborg and his collaborators produced plutonium-239 through the bombardment of uranium. In their experiments bombarding uranium with deuterons, they observed the creation of neptunium, element 93. But it then underwent beta-decay, forming a new element, plutonium, with 94 protons. Plutonium is fairly stable, but undergoes alpha-decay, which explained the presence of alpha particles coming from neptunium. Thus, on March 28, 1941, Seaborg, physicist Emilio Segrè and Berkeley chemist Joseph W. Kennedy were able to show that plutonium (then known only as element 94) was fissile, an important distinction that was crucial to the decisions made in directing Manhattan Project research. In 1966, Room 307 of Gilman Hall on the campus at the Berkeley, where Seaborg did his work, was declared a US National Historic Landmark.

Later in 1941 and early 1942, Seaborg, John W. Gofman and Raymond W. Stoughton identified uranium-233 and showed that it is fissile, making it a potential nuclear fuel alongside uranium-235 and plutonium-239. Their report was sent to the Uranium Committee on April 14, 1942, but wartime secrecy delayed its open publication until 1947.

In addition to plutonium, he is credited as a lead discoverer of americium, curium, and berkelium, and as a co-discoverer of californium, einsteinium, fermium, mendelevium, nobelium and seaborgium, the first element named after a living person. He shared the Nobel Prize in Chemistry in 1951 with Edwin McMillan for "their discoveries in the chemistry of the first transuranium elements."

== Scientific contributions during the Manhattan Project ==
On April 19, 1942, Seaborg reached Chicago and joined the chemistry group at the Metallurgical Laboratory of the Manhattan Project at the University of Chicago, where Enrico Fermi and his group would later convert uranium-238 to plutonium-239 in a controlled nuclear chain reaction. Seaborg's role was to figure out how to extract the tiny bit of plutonium from the mass of uranium. Plutonium-239 was isolated in visible amounts using a transmutation reaction on August 20, 1942, and weighed on September 10, 1942, in Seaborg's Chicago laboratory. He was responsible for the multi-stage chemical process that separated, concentrated and isolated plutonium. This process was further developed at the Clinton Engineering Works in Oak Ridge, Tennessee, and then entered full-scale production at the Hanford Engineer Works, in Richland, Washington.

Seaborg's theoretical development of the actinide concept resulted in a redrawing of the periodic table into its current configuration with the actinide series appearing below the lanthanide series. Seaborg developed the chemical elements americium and curium while in Chicago. He managed to secure patents for both elements. His patent on curium never proved commercially viable because of the element's short half-life, but americium is commonly used in household smoke detectors and thus provided a good source of royalty income to Seaborg in later years. Prior to the test of the first nuclear weapon, Seaborg joined with several other leading scientists in a written statement known as the Franck Report (secret at the time but since published) unsuccessfully calling on President Truman to conduct a public demonstration of the atomic bomb witnessed by the Japanese.

== Professor and Chancellor at the University of California, Berkeley ==
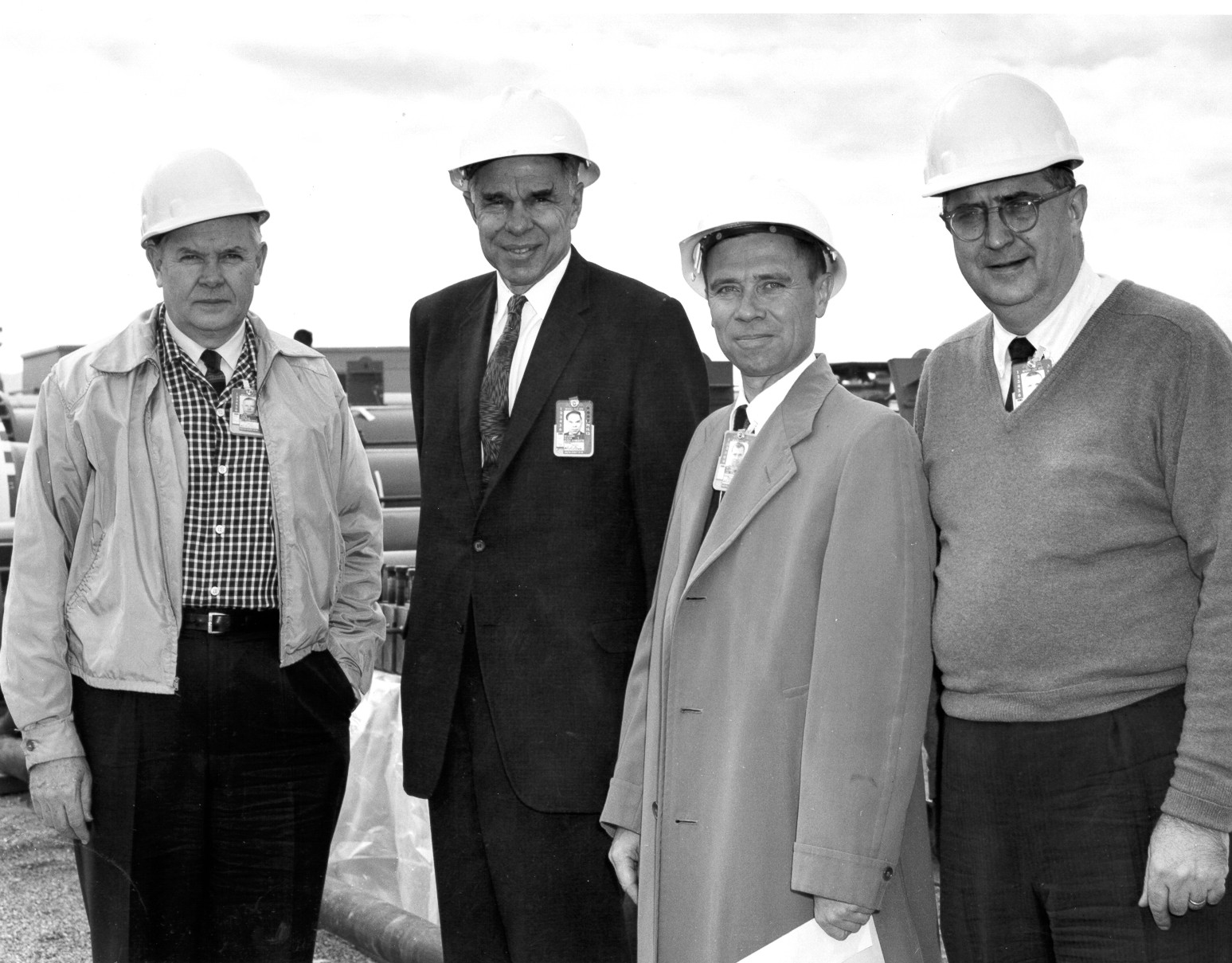
Seaborg (second from left) during Operation Plumbbob

After the conclusion of World War II and the Manhattan Project, Seaborg was eager to return to academic life and university research free from the restrictions of wartime secrecy. In 1946, he added to his responsibilities as a professor by heading the nuclear chemistry research at the Lawrence Radiation Laboratory operated by the University of California on behalf of the United States Atomic Energy Commission (AEC). Seaborg was named one of the "Ten Outstanding Young Men in America" by the US Junior Chamber of Commerce in 1947 (along with Richard Nixon and others). Seaborg was elected a Member of the National Academy of Sciences in 1948. From 1954 to 1961 he served as associate director of the radiation laboratory. He was appointed by President Truman to serve as a member of the General Advisory Committee of the AEC, an assignment he retained until 1960.

Seaborg served as chancellor at the University of California, Berkeley, from 1958 to 1961. His term coincided with a relaxation of McCarthy-era restrictions on students' freedom of expression that had begun under his predecessor, Clark Kerr. In October 1958, Seaborg announced that the university had relaxed its prior prohibitions on political activity on a trial basis, and the ban on communists speaking on campus was lifted. This paved the way for the Free Speech Movement of 1964–65.

Seaborg was an enthusiastic supporter of Cal's sports teams. San Francisco columnist Herb Caen was fond of pointing out that Seaborg's surname is an anagram of "Go Bears", a popular cheer at UC Berkeley. Seaborg was proud of the fact that the Cal Bears won their first and only National Collegiate Athletic Association (NCAA) basketball championship in 1959, while he was chancellor. The football team also won the conference title and played in the Rose Bowl that year. He served on the Faculty Athletic Committee for several years and was the co-author of a book, Roses from the Ashes: Breakup and Rebirth in Pacific Coast Intercollegiate Athletics (2000), concerning the Pacific Coast Conference recruiting scandal, and the founding of what is now the Pac-12, in which he played a role in restoring confidence in the integrity of collegiate sports.

Seaborg served on the President's Science Advisory Committee (PSAC) during the Eisenhower administration. PSAC produced a report on "Scientific Progress, the Universities, and the Federal Government", also known as the "Seaborg Report", in November 1960, that urged greater federal funding of science. In 1959, he helped found the Berkeley Space Sciences Laboratory with Clark Kerr.

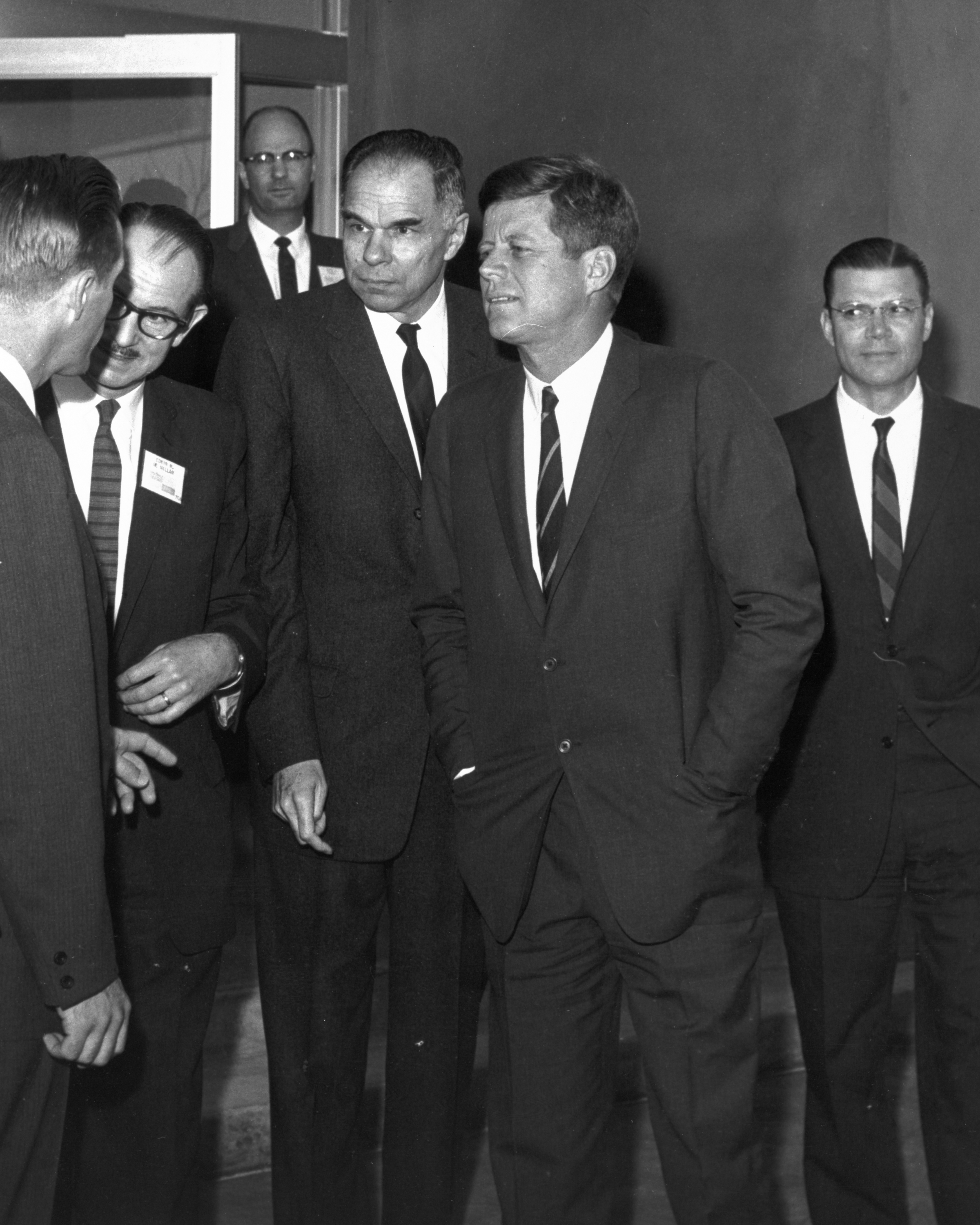
From left to right: Chairman Seaborg, President Kennedy, Secretary McNamara on March 23, 1962. By this point, McNamara and Seaborg had been discussing the AEC's studies on the ecological effects of nuclear war and "clean" weapon alternatives. (Courtesy: National Security Archive, Original: National Archives)

== Chairman of the Atomic Energy Commission ==
After appointment by President John F. Kennedy and confirmation by the United States Senate, Seaborg was chairman of the Atomic Energy Commission (AEC) from 1961 to 1971. His pending appointment by President-elect Kennedy was nearly derailed in late 1960 when members of the Kennedy transition team learned that Seaborg had been listed in a U.S. News & World Report article as a member of "Nixon's Idea Men". Seaborg said that as a lifetime Democrat he was baffled when the article appeared associating him with outgoing Vice President Richard Nixon, a Republican whom Seaborg considered a casual acquaintance.

During the early 1960s, Seaborg became concerned with the ecological and biological effects of nuclear weapons, especially those that would impact human life significantly. In response, he commissioned the Technical Analysis Branch of the AEC to study these matters further. Seaborg's provision for these innovative studies led the US Government to more seriously pursue the development and possible use of "clean" nuclear weapons.

While chairman of the AEC, Seaborg participated on the negotiating team for the Limited Test Ban Treaty (LTBT), in which the US, UK, and USSR agreed to ban all above-ground test detonations of nuclear weapons. Seaborg considered his contributions to the achievement of the LTBT as one of his greatest accomplishments. Despite strict rules from the Soviets about photography at the signing ceremony, Seaborg used a tiny camera to take a close-up photograph of Soviet Premier Nikita Khrushchev as he signed the treaty.

Seaborg enjoyed a close relationship with President Lyndon Johnson and influenced the administration to pursue the Nuclear Non-Proliferation Treaty. Seaborg was called to the White House in the first week of the Nixon Administration in January 1969 to advise President Richard Nixon on his first diplomatic crisis involving the Soviets and nuclear testing. He clashed with Nixon presidential adviser John Ehrlichman over the treatment of a Jewish scientist, Zalman Shapiro, whom the Nixon administration suspected of leaking nuclear secrets to Israel.

Seaborg published several books and journal articles during his tenure at the AEC. He predicted the existence of elements beyond those on the periodic table, the transactinide series and the superactinide series of undiscovered synthetic elements. While most of these theoretical future elements have extremely short half-lives and thus no expected practical applications, he also hypothesized the existence of stable super-heavy isotopes of certain elements in an island of stability. Seaborg served as chairman of the AEC until 1971.

== Return to California ==
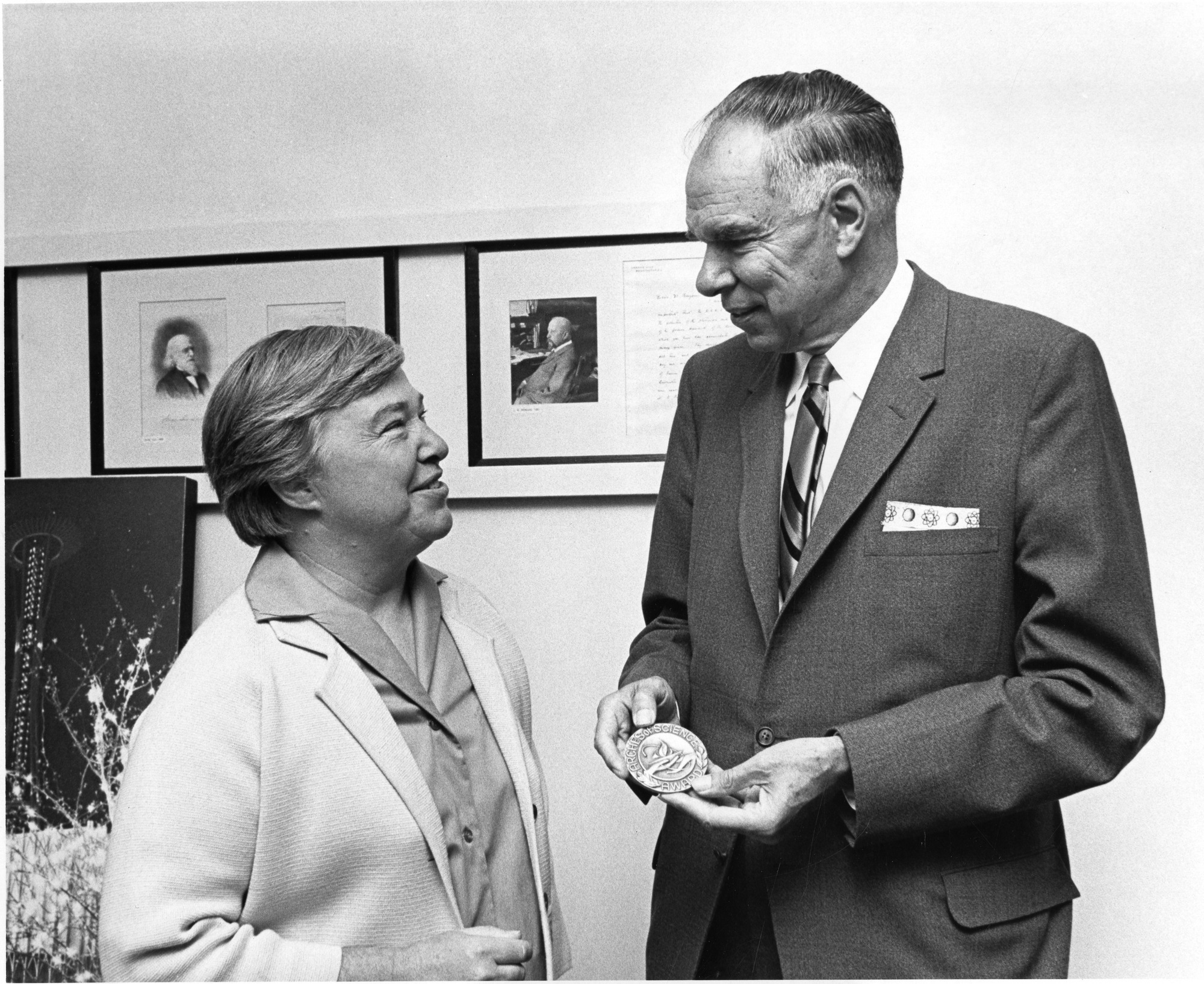
Seaborg (right) with marine biologist Dixy Lee Ray on September 17, 1968

Following his service as Chairman of the AEC, Seaborg returned to UC Berkeley where he was awarded the position of University Professor. At the time, there had been fewer University Professors at UC Berkeley than Nobel Prize winners. He also served as Chairman of the Lawrence Hall of Science where he became the principal investigator for Great Explorations in Math and Science (GEMS) working with director Jacqueline Barber. Seaborg served as chancellor at the University of California, Berkeley, from 1958 to 1961, and served as president of the American Association for the Advancement of Science in 1972 and as president of the American Chemical Society in 1976.

In 1980, he transmuted several thousand atoms of bismuth-209 into gold (^{197}Au) at the Lawrence Berkeley Laboratory. His experimental technique, using the lab's Bevalac particle accelerator, was able to remove protons and neutrons from the bismuth atoms by bombarding it with carbon and neon nuclei traveling near the speed of light. Seaborg's technique would have been far too expensive to enable routine manufacturing of gold, but his work was close to the mythical Philosopher's Stone. As gold has four fewer protons and (taking the only naturally occurring bulk isotopes of either) eight fewer neutrons than bismuth, a total of twelve nucleons have to be removed from the bismuth nucleus to produce gold using Seaborg's method.

In 1981, Seaborg became a founding member of the World Cultural Council.

In 1983, President Ronald Reagan appointed Seaborg to serve on the National Commission on Excellence in Education. The commission produced a report "A Nation at Risk: The Imperative for Educational Reform", which focused national attention on education as a national issue germane to the federal government. In 2008, Margaret Spellings wrote that

A Nation at Risk delivered a wake up call for our education system. It described stark realities like a significant number of functionally illiterate high schoolers, plummeting student performance, and international competitors breathing down our necks. It was a warning, a reproach, and a call to arms.

In the 1990s, Seaborg encouraged the Bangladeshi-American environmental scientist Rash Bihari Ghosh in his plans for an institute on water contamination in the Bengal Basin, later the International Institute of Bengal and Himalayan Basins, co-founded by fellow Nobel Laureate physicist Charles H. Townes in Berkeley.

Seaborg lived most of his later life in Lafayette, California, where he devoted himself to editing and publishing the journals that documented both his early life and later career. He rallied a group of scientists who criticized the science curriculum in the state of California, which he viewed as far too socially oriented and not nearly focused enough on hard science. California Governor Pete Wilson appointed Seaborg to head a committee that proposed changes to California's science curriculum despite outcries from labor organizations and others.

== Personal life ==
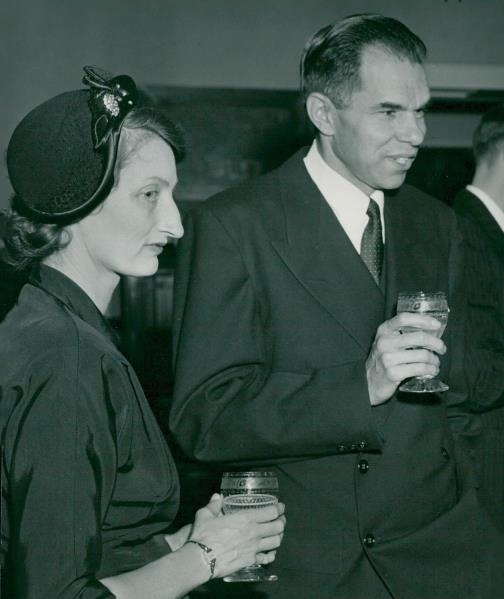
Helen and Glenn Seaborg in Stockholm in 1951

In 1942, Seaborg married Helen Griggs, the secretary of physicist Ernest Lawrence. Under wartime pressure, Seaborg had moved to Chicago while engaged to Griggs. When Seaborg returned to accompany Griggs for the journey back to Chicago, friends expected them to marry in Chicago. But, eager to be married, Seaborg and Griggs impulsively got off the train in the town of Caliente, Nevada, for what they thought would be a quick wedding. When they asked for City Hall, they found Caliente had none—they would have to travel 25 miles (40 km) north to Pioche, the county seat. With no car, this was no easy feat, but one of Caliente's newest deputy sheriffs turned out to be a recent graduate of the Cal Berkeley chemistry department and was more than happy to do a favor for Seaborg. The deputy sheriff arranged for the wedding couple to ride up and back to Pioche in a mail truck. The witnesses at the Seaborg wedding were a clerk and a janitor. Glenn Seaborg and Helen Griggs Seaborg had seven children, of whom the first, Peter Glenn Seaborg, died in 1997 (his twin Paulette having died in infancy). The others were Lynne Seaborg Cobb, David Seaborg, Steve Seaborg, Eric Seaborg, and Dianne Seaborg.

Seaborg was an avid hiker. Upon becoming Chairman of the AEC in 1961, he commenced taking daily hikes through a trail that he blazed at the headquarters site in Germantown, Maryland. He frequently invited colleagues and visitors to accompany him, and the trail became known as the "Glenn Seaborg Trail." He and his wife Helen are credited with blazing a 12-mile (19 km) trail in the East Bay area near their home in Lafayette, California. This trail has since become a part of the American Hiking Association's cross-country network of trails. Seaborg and his wife walked the trail network from Contra Costa County all the way to the California–Nevada border.

There is a beauty in discovery. There is mathematics in music, a kinship of science and poetry in the description of nature, and exquisite form in a molecule. Attempts to place different disciplines in different camps are revealed as artificial in the face of the unity of knowledge. All literate men are sustained by the philosopher, the historian, the political analyst, the economist, the scientist, the poet, the artisan and the musician.

— Glenn Seaborg

Seaborg was elected a foreign member of the Royal Swedish Academy of Sciences in 1972 and a Foreign Member of the Royal Society (ForMemRS) of London in 1985. He was honored as Swedish-American of the Year in 1962 by the Vasa Order of America. In 1991, the organization named "Local Lodge Glenn T. Seaborg No. 719" in his honor during the Seaborg Honors ceremony at which he appeared. This lodge maintains a scholarship fund in his name, as does the unrelated Swedish-American Club of Los Angeles.

Seaborg kept a close bond to his Swedish origin. He visited Sweden every so often, and his family were members of the Swedish Pemer Genealogical Society, a family association open for every descendant of the Pemer family, a Swedish family with German origin, from which Seaborg was descended on his mother's side. (In recent years, after both men's passings, it has been discovered that physicist colleague Edward J. Lofgren was also descended from the Pemer family.) Seaborg even responded to the Swedish king's Nobel prize toast in his mother's native region's dialect, which he described as "It was as if a Swede had ''y'alled" in English with a Southern Accent."

== Death ==
On August 24, 1998, while in Boston to attend a meeting by the American Chemical Society, Seaborg suffered a stroke, which led to his death six months later on February 25, 1999, at his home in Lafayette, 58 years and two days to the date that he discovered plutonium.

== Honors and awards ==
During his lifetime, Seaborg is said to have been the author or co-author of numerous books and 500 scientific journal articles, many of them brief reports on fast-breaking discoveries in nuclear science while other subjects, most notably the actinide concept, represented major theoretical contributions in the history of science. He held more than 40 patents—among them the only patents ever issued for chemical elements, americium and curium, and received more than 50 doctorates and honorary degrees in his lifetime. At one time, he was listed in the Guinness Book of World Records as having the longest entry in Marquis Who's Who in America. In February 2005, he was posthumously inducted into the National Inventors Hall of Fame. In April 2011 the executive council of the Committee for Skeptical Inquiry (CSI) selected Seaborg for inclusion in CSI's Pantheon of Skeptics. The Pantheon of Skeptics was created by CSI to remember the legacy of deceased fellows of CSI and their contributions to the cause of scientific skepticism. His papers are in the Library of Congress.

Seaborg was elected to the United States National Academy of Sciences in 1948, the American Philosophical Society in 1952, and the American Academy of Arts and Sciences in 1958. The American Chemical Society-Chicago Section honored him with the Willard Gibbs Award in 1966. The American Academy of Achievement presented Seaborg with the Golden Plate Award in 1972. The element seaborgium was named after Seaborg by Albert Ghiorso, E. Kenneth Hulet, and others, who also credited Seaborg as a co-discoverer. It was named while Seaborg was still alive, which proved controversial. He influenced the naming of so many elements that with the announcement of seaborgium, it was noted in Discover magazine's review of the year in science that he could receive a letter addressed in chemical elements: seaborgium, lawrencium (for the Lawrence Berkeley Laboratory where he worked), berkelium, californium, americium. Seaborgium is the first element ever to have been officially named after a living person. The second element to be so named is oganesson, in 2016, after Yuri Oganessian.

== Selected bibliography ==
- Seaborg, G.T.; James, R.A.; Morgan, L.O. (January 1948). The New Element Americium (Atomic Number 95). US Atomic Energy Commission. doi:10.2172/4435330. OSTI 4435330. Archived from the original on October 20, 2019.
- Seaborg, G.T.; James, R.A.; Ghiorso, A. (January 1948). The New Element Curium (Atomic Number 96). US Atomic Energy Commission. OSTI 4421946.
- Seaborg, G.T.; Thompson, S.G.; Ghiorso, A. (April 1950). The New Element Berkelium (Atomic Number 97). UC Berkeley, Radiation Laboratory. doi:10.2172/4421999. OSTI 4421999. Archived from the original on October 20, 2019.
- Seaborg, G.T.; Thompson, S.G.; Street, K. Jr.; Ghiroso, A. (June 1950). The New Element Californium (Atomic Number 98). UC Berkeley, Radiation Laboratory. doi:10.2172/932819. hdl:2027/mdp.39015086449165. OSTI 932819. Archived from the original on May 24, 2022.
- Seaborg, G.T. (December 1951). The Transuranium Elements – Present Status: Nobel Lecture. UC Berkeley, Radiation Laboratory. doi:10.2172/4406579. OSTI 4406579.
- Seaborg, G.T.; Thompson, S.G.; Harvey, B.G.; Choppin, G.R. (July 1954). Chemical Properties of Elements 99 and 100 (Einsteinium and Fermium). UC Berkeley, Radiation Laboratory. doi:10.2172/4405197. OSTI 4405197. S2CID 54678232. Archived from the original on October 20, 2019.
- Seaborg, G.T. (September 1967). The First Weighing of Plutonium. US Atomic Energy Commission. OSTI 814965.
- Seaborg, G.T. (July 1970). Peaceful Uses of Nuclear Energy: A Collection of Speeches. US Atomic Energy Commission. OSTI 4042849.
- Seaborg, G.T. (ed ). (January 1980). Seaborg, G.T. (ed.). Symposium Commemorating the 25th Anniversary of the Discovery of Mendelevium. Lawrence Berkeley National Laboratory. OSTI 6468225.
- Seaborg, G.T. (August 1990). Transuranium Elements: a Half Century. Lawrence Berkeley National Laboratory. OSTI 6604648.
- Seaborg, G.T. (March 1995). "My career as a radioisotope hunter". Journal of the American Medical Association. 273 (12): 961–964. doi:10.1001/jama.273.12.961. PMID 7884957.

== General references ==
- Hoffman, D.C. (2007). "Glenn Theodore Seaborg 19 April 1912 – 25 February 1999". Biographical Memoirs of Fellows of the Royal Society. 53: 328–338. doi:10.1098/rsbm.2007.0021. JSTOR 20461382.
- Rhodes, Richard (1986). The Making of the Atomic Bomb. New York: Simon & Schuster. ISBN 978-0-671-44133-3. OCLC 13793436.
- Seaborg, G.T.; Seaborg, E. (2001). Adventures in the Atomic Age: From Watts to Washington. Farrar, Straus and Giroux. ISBN 978-0-374-29991-0.

Academic offices
| Preceded by Clark Kerr | Chancellor of the University of California, Berkeley; 1958–1961 | Succeeded by Edward W. Strong |
Political offices
| Preceded by John McCone | Chair of the Atomic Energy Commission; 1961–1971 | Succeeded by James R. Schlesinger |
