= Helen L. Seaborg =

American child welfare advocate (1917–2006)

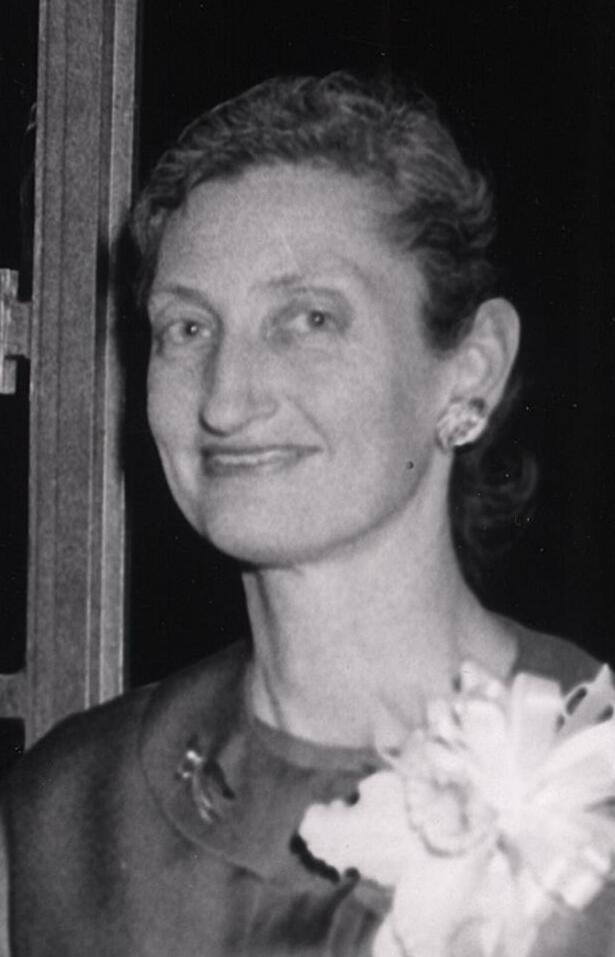
- Helen L. Seaborg at E. O . Lawrence Award Ceremony, April 29, 1965
- Born: Helen Griggs; March 2, 1917; Sioux City, Iowa, U.S.
- Died: August 29, 2006 (aged 89)
- Education: Santa Ana College (AA); University of California, Berkeley (BA)
- Occupation: Child welfare advocate
- Spouse: Glenn T. Seaborg (m. 1942; died 1999)
- Children: 7, including David

Helen L. Seaborg (née Griggs; March 2, 1917 – August 29, 2006) was an American child welfare advocate. She was married to Nobel Prize-winning chemist Glenn T. Seaborg.

== Life ==
Born March 2, 1917, in a Florence Crittenton home for unwed mothers in Sioux City, Iowa, she was adopted by George and Iva Griggs. After her father's death, Griggs and her mother moved to the Santa Ana, California, area.

While working a number of jobs, she earned an A.A. from Santa Ana College and a B.A. in English from the University of California at Berkeley in 1939.

Helen became the personal secretary to Ernest O. Lawrence, who was director of what became the Lawrence Berkeley National Laboratory and a recipient of the Nobel Prize in Physics. While working part time for Lawrence in 1938, she met Glenn T. Seaborg, a scientist who frequently used Lawrence's cyclotrons to create new chemical isotopes, including several with applications in nuclear medicine. Seaborg dictated a telegram to Helen that was to be sent to Physical Review. Prior to the US entry in World War II, Seaborg led a team that discovered plutonium. Seaborg was recruited for the Manhattan Project while he was dating Griggs. He proposed marriage. They were married in Nevada in 1942 on their way to work in the Chicago "Metallurgical Project" of the Manhattan Project. Helen worked as an administrative assistant to the scientists working in Chicago.

Throughout Glenn's career, she was his traveling companion and provided behind-the-scenes administrative help that enabled Seaborg to pursue many side projects, including extensive publishing efforts. Seaborg credited his ability to compile so many accomplishments to her valuable advice and assistance. As the wife of the chancellor of U.C. Berkeley she took on many formal duties related to protocol and dealing with official university guests. When her husband served as chairman of the U.S. Atomic Energy Commission from 1961 to 1971, she fulfilled a number of diplomatic and protocol roles. Most notably, she filled in for First Lady Jacqueline Kennedy at a White House dinner in the days following the death of the Kennedys' infant son.

She was an active advocate of child welfare. She felt indebted to the YWCA for assistance during her own periods of childhood poverty. She served on the board of directors of the YWCA in both Berkeley, California, and Washington, D.C. She worked as a mediator between the two racially segregated YWCA organizations in Washington to successfully achieve their integration. She also founded and served as a board member of INCAP, an organization that assisted in social assimilation of black and white elementary school students during the period of voluntary bussing to achieve integration.

As an avid hiker, she and her husband spent weekends blazing a trail across the state of California. In 1980, this trail was used as part of the HikaNation project by the American Hiking Society. Later, much of the route became a part of the transcontinental American Discovery Trail.

She and Glenn had seven children: the late Peter; Paulette, who died in infancy; Lynne, David; Stephen; Eric; and Dianne. Helen Seaborg died of pneumonia on August 29, 2006.

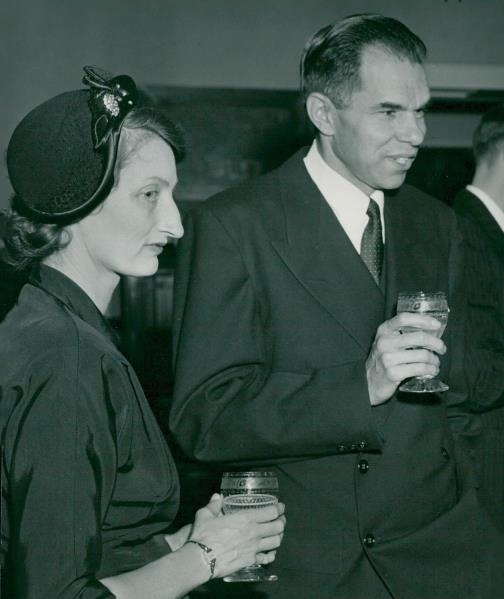
Helen and Glenn Seaborg in Stockholm, 1951

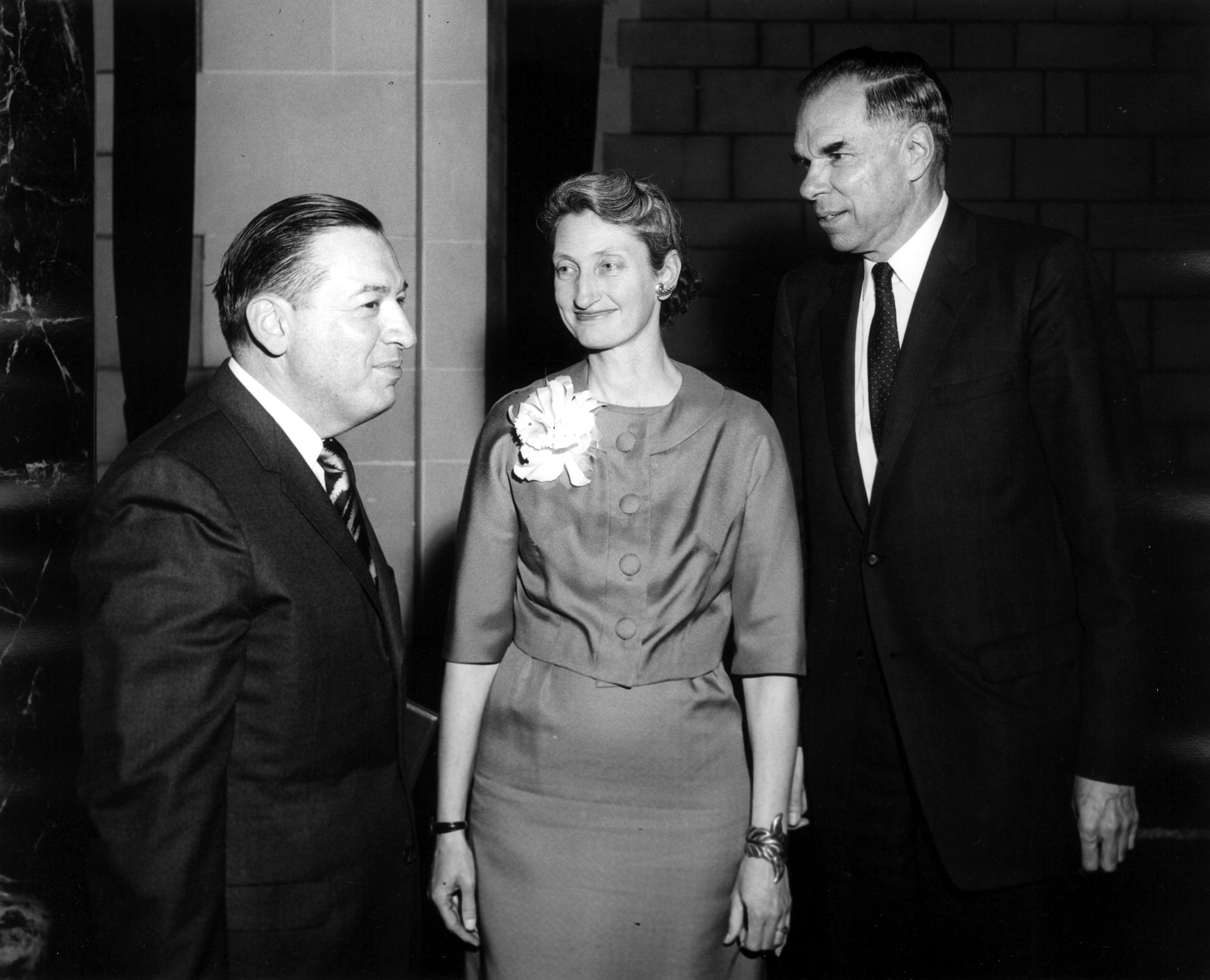
Lawrence Award, 1964. Jacob Bigeleisen, Helen L. Seaborg and Glenn T. Seaborg.
