= David Seaborg =

American biologist

- Born: April 22, 1949 (age 77); Berkeley, California, U.S.
- Education: University of California, Davis; University of California, Berkeley
- Occupations: Evolutionary biologist; peace activist; author
- Parent(s): Glenn T. Seaborg; Helen L. Seaborg

David Seaborg (born April 22, 1949) is an American evolutionary biologist, peace activist, author and leader in the environmental movement. He serves as director of the World Rainforest Fund, the Seaborg Open Space Fund, and the Greater Lafayette Open Space Fund (a conservancy raising money to purchase open space in the Lamorinda region). He was also a sperm donor to the Nobel Prize Sperm Bank

== Family and education ==
David Seaborg was born on April 22, 1949, in Berkeley, California, the son of Helen L. Seaborg and Nobel Laureate Glenn T. Seaborg (who discovered plutonium among other accomplishments). He attended and graduated from the University of California, Davis, with a bachelor's degree in zoology. Seaborg received his master's degree in zoology from the University of California, Berkeley. Seaborg was born on Earth Day in 1949.

== Activism ==
Seaborg worked to secure the passage through the Berkeley City Council of an ordinance that would ban the use of old growth rainforest and redwood in all products used by the city of Berkeley. This ordinance also required all businesses contracting with Berkeley to stop using old growth rainforest and redwood in any of the products or services that Berkeley hired to use or perform as well as in any product that was sold to the city. He is working with the Berkeley city council to secure passage of an ordinance banning the use of plastic bags in grocery stores and plastic newspaper wrappings in the city.

Seaborg has published several scientific articles discussing biological topics such as evolution, behavioral plasticity, and biodiversity. He wrote an article titled "The Greenhouse Diet" in the Earth Island Journal in the winter of 2004 that is a summary of the scientific research on the effects of high atmospheric levels of carbon dioxide other than global warming. This article states that as the amount of carbon dioxide in the air increases the plants grow larger but are less rich in nutrients despite the excess of carbon dioxide. Seaborg has also written a book consisting of a collection of poems titled Honor Thy Sowbug (2008).

Seaborg has written a biography of his father, which describes Glenn Seaborg's upbringing and contributions to nuclear science from the perspective of his son.

Seaborg founded and heads the World Rainforest Fund, a nonprofit foundation dedicated to saving the earth's tropical rainforests and biodiversity. He also founded and headed the Seaborg Open Space Fund, named in honor of his father, to raise money and awareness to save open space from development in central Contra Costa County, California. This fund raised $20,000 in less than a year to help save Acalanes Ridge in Lafayette, California.

In the 1990s and early 2000s, he served on the Board of Directors and as Vice President of the Club of Rome of the USA, the environmental think tank that published The Limits to Growth in the 1970s.
