= List of accolades received by Glenn T. Seaborg =

Nobel Prize–winning chemist, Glenn T. Seaborg is known for having received numerous awards and honors during his lifetime. At one time, Seaborg was listed in the Guinness Book of World Records for having the longest entry in Marquis Who's Who. Glenn T. Seaborg's legacy was cemented with the naming of Element 106 as Seaborgium in his honor. The list below is provided as a supplement to his biographical entry.

== Partial list of awards and honors ==
- Ten Outstanding Young Men in America, United States Junior Chamber of Commerce, 1947.
- Alumnus of the Year Award, University of California, Berkeley, 1948.
- American Chemical Society's Award in Pure Chemistry, 1947.
- John Ericsson Gold Medal, by the American Society of Swedish Engineers, 1948.
- Nichols Medal (chemistry), New York Section, American Chemical Society, 1948.
- Nobel Prize in Chemistry, 1951.
- John Scott Medal, City of Philadelphia, 1952.
- Perkin Medal, American Section of the Society of Chemical Industry, 1957.
- Enrico Fermi Award, United States Atomic Energy Commission, 1959.
- Edgar Fahs Smith Lectureship Award, Philadelphia Section, American Chemical Society, 1960.
- Swedish American of the Year, 1962.
- The Franklin Medal, 1963.
- Charles Lathrop Parsons Award, presented by the American Chemical Society, 1964.
- American Chemical Society's Willard Gibbs Award, 1966.
- The Nuclear Pioneer Award, 1971.
- Golden Plate Award, American Academy of Achievement, 1972.
- American Institute of Chemists Gold Medal, 1973.
- French Legion of Honor, 1973.
- Priestley Medal, presented by the American Chemical Society, 1979.
- The Great Swedish Heritage Award, 1984.
- Clark Kerr Medal, 1986.
- Glenn T. Seaborg Medal, UCLA Department of Chemistry, 1987.
- Vannevar Bush Award, 1988.
- National Medal of Science, 1991.
- Royal Order of the Polar Star, 1992.
- George C. Pimentel Award in Chemical Education, by the American Chemical Society, 1994.
- Chancellor Emeritus, University of California, Berkeley.
- Chairman Emeritus, United States Atomic Energy Commission.
- The American Chemical Society 1999 Annual Report was dedicated "in fond memory" of Glenn Seaborg who had been a member from 1938-1999.
- National Inventors Hall of Fame, 2005.
