= Arthur Wahl =

American chemist (1917–2006)

Arthur C. Wahl
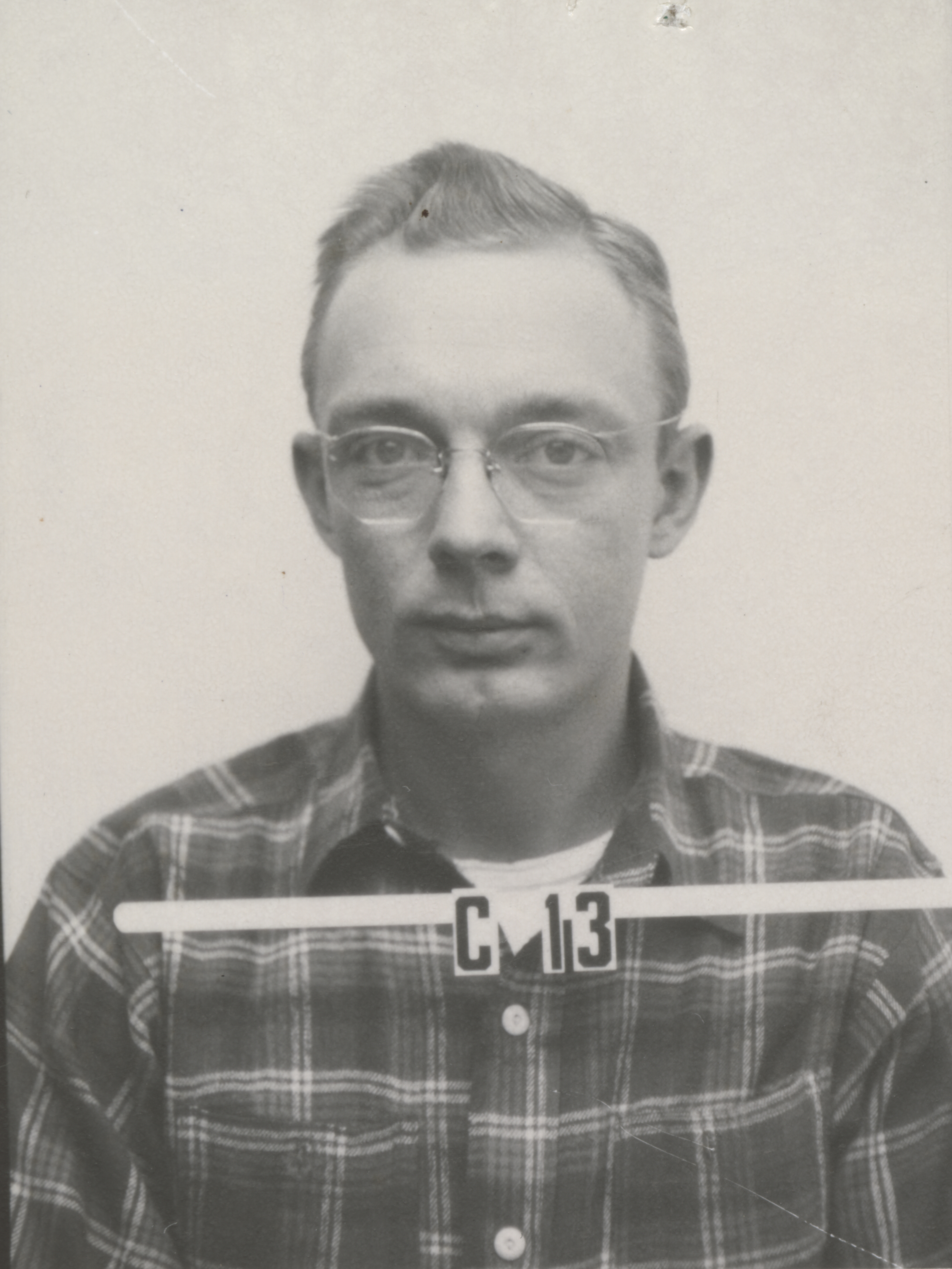
- Wahl's identity badge photo from Los Alamos Laboratory
- Born: Arthur Charles Wahl; September 8, 1917; Des Moines, Iowa
- Died: March 6, 2006 (aged 88); Santa Fe, New Mexico, U.S.
- Education: Iowa State University (B.S.) and University of California, Berkeley (Ph.D.)
- Known for: First isolation of plutonium
- Awards: ACS Award for Nuclear Chemistry (1966)
- Scientific career
- Fields: Chemistry
- Workplaces: Washington University in St. Louis
- Doctoral advisor: Glenn T. Seaborg

Arthur Charles Wahl (September 8, 1917 – March 6, 2006) was an American chemist who, as a doctoral student of Glenn T. Seaborg at the University of California, Berkeley, first isolated plutonium (94) in February 1941 shortly after the element neptunium (93) was discovered by McMillan and Abelson in 1940.

Wahl was a researcher on the Manhattan Project in Los Alamos until 1946, when he joined the faculty of Arts and Sciences at Washington University in St. Louis. Beginning in 1952, he was the Henry V. Farr Professor of Radiochemistry; he received the American Chemical Society Award in Nuclear Chemistry in 1966 and retired in 1983. He moved back to Los Alamos in 1991 and continued his scientific writing until 2005.

He died in 2006 of Parkinson's disease and pneumonia.
