= Edward Strong =

Edward W. Strong
- Born: October 16, 1901; Dallas, Oregon
- Died: January 13, 1990 (aged 88); Berkeley, California
- Known for: Free Speech Movement
- Scientific career
- Fields: Philosopher and Administrator
- Workplaces: University of California, Berkeley

Edward William Strong (October 16, 1901 - January 13, 1990) was the Chancellor of the University of California at Berkeley between 1961 and 1965. He resigned in March 1965, in large part due to his actions during the Free Speech Movement, which was beginning at that time. Besides his role as chancellor, Strong founded UC Berkeley's Department of Sociology and Social Institutions in 1946, chaired it until 1953, as well as in another of other campus roles.

== Early life and education ==
Edward Strong graduated from Stanford University in 1925, and went on to receive a master's and doctorate in philosophy from Columbia University in 1929 and 1937, respectively.

== Career ==
Edward Strong first joined the faculty at UC Berkeley in 1932 as a lecturer, before being promoted to full professor in 1947. He founded Berkeley's Department of Sociology and Social Institutions in 1946, and chaired it until 1953. Strong also served for most of this period as an associate dean of the College of Letters and Science. He was appointed a Vice-Chancellor in 1958, and became Chancellor of the University of California at Berkeley, a role he served between 1961 and 1965. While Strong was Chancellor, he helped contribute to the establishment of Berkeley's Department of Computer Science. He resigned in March 1965, in large part due to his actions during the Free Speech Movement, which was beginning at that time. After his resignation as Chancellor, Strong was appointed to the Mills Professorship of Intellectual and Moral Philosophy and Civil Polity, where he taught until 1967, when he retired. Besides for his academic work, Strong was once president of the American Philosophical Association, and was the primary founder of the Journal of the History of Philosophy. He was also instrumental in the construction of the Radiation Laboratory on Charter Hill, which morphed in to the Lawrence Berkeley Laboratory, which later participated in significant research into nuclear weapons.

=== Controversy as Chancellor ===
Strong's tenure as Chancellor at Berkeley was marked by strife related to the free speech movement, leading to his resignation in March 1965. When Strong resigned he issued a statement blaming Clark Kerr (who would be dismissed by the Board of Regents in January 1967) for "capitulating to the tide of revolt, subversive of law and order." While acting as Chancellor, Strong favored harsh disciplinary policies, and was upset that Clark Kerr had made certain concessions to the "student rebels" involved in the Free Speech Movement.

Strong's actions during the Free Speech Movement were harshly criticized by some students and faculty members for the approach he took to free speech activity on campus.
