= Sollentuna socken =

Historical location

Coordinates: 59°28′00″N 17°55′06″E

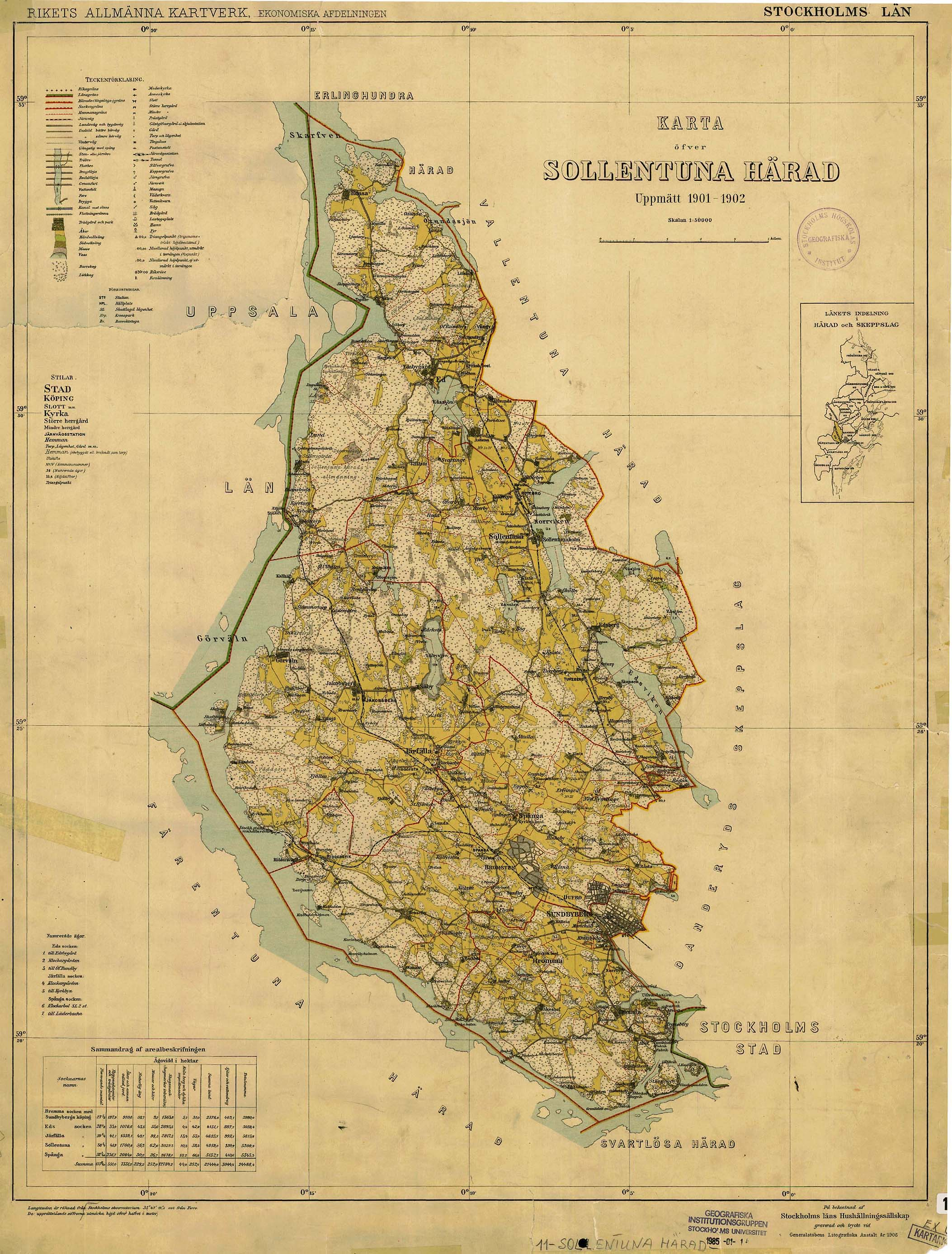
Sollentuna Socken in Sollentuna Hundred 1901

Sollentuna socken is a former socken of Sollentuna Hundred in Uppland, Sweden. The area largely corresponds to the modern Sollentuna Municipality, but not completely. Hansta was incorporated into Stockholm Municipality in 1980, while other localities (such as Silverdal) were incorporated into the municipality from other parishes.

The parish encompassed an area of approximately 49.50 square kilometres (19.11 mi^{2}), whereof 46.08 square kilometres (17.79 mi^{2}) were land. Edsberg Castle, the seat farm of Sollentunaholm, the locality of Sjöberg, the municipal districts of Rotebro, Viby, Norrviken, Vaxmora, Häggvik, Edsberg, Tureberg, and Helenelund as well as Sollentuna railway station and the parish church of Sollentuna were located in the parish.

== Geography ==
Sollentuna Parish was located north of Stockholm, around the northern parts of Edsviken and the southern parts of Norrviken and straddling the Stockholmsåsen esker, running in a north-south direction. The parish was mostly low-lying farmland surrounded by wooded hills reaching up to 70 metres (230 ft) above mean sea level.

== Etymology ==
The name (written as Solendatunum in 1287) was taken from the church village. The ending tuna traces its roots to an archaic word for 'enclosure'. The beginning of the word is from the name soländar, which denotes an inhabitant of Soland. This derives in turn from the word land, meaning 'village', and likely the prefix sol, meaning 'sun'. This has a somewhat ambiguous interpretation, but may have referred to a sunlit place.

== Administrative history ==
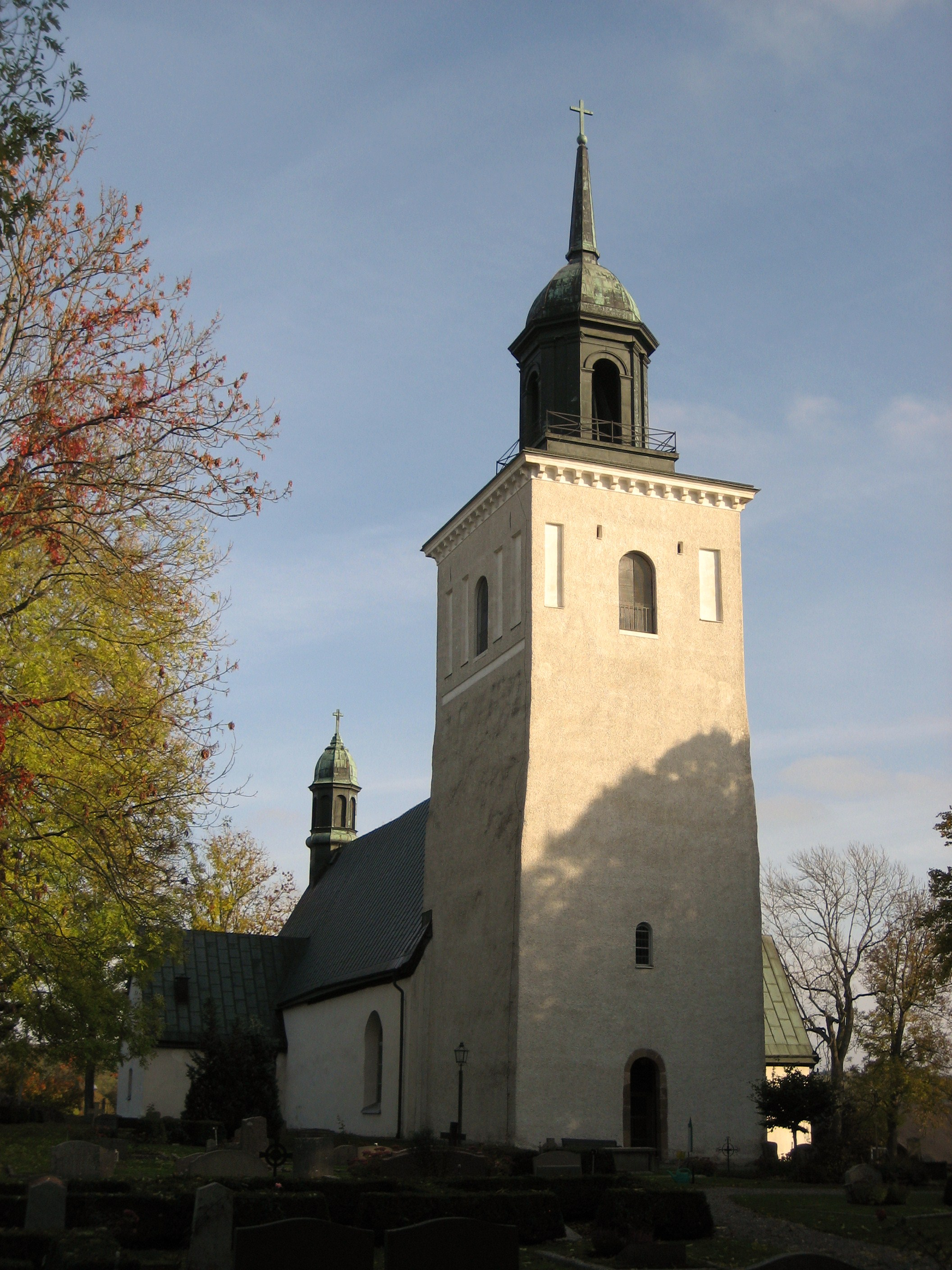
Sollentuna Church

Sollentuna Parish is first found in written records in 1287 (as 'de Solendatunum'). The oldest parts of Sollentuna Church Sollentuna were built around the end of the 12th century.

With the municipality reform of 1862, the ecclesiastical and civil functions of the parish were separated. The religious responsibilities fell to the local ecclesiastical parish of the Church of Sweden (Sollentuna församling), while the secular responsibilities fell to Sollentuna landskommun. The landskommun became Sollentuna köping in 1944, which in turn became the modern Sollentuna Municipality in 1971.

Men from the parish were conscripted into the Life Regiment Dragoons Corps. Sailors were conscripted into the Södra Roslags 2:a båtsmanskompani.

== Historical and archaeological sites ==
There are a number of gravrösen (a sort of chambered cairn) dating back to the Bronze Age scattered throughout the municipality. There are also around 60 burial sites, a tumulus over 20 metres (66 ft) in diameter, and five hill forts from the Iron Age. A dozen runic inscriptions have been found.
