= Sollentuna =

Sollentuna may refer to:

- Sollentuna Municipality, a Swedish municipality
- Sollentuna railway station, a station of the Stockholm commuter rail
- Sollentuna Hundred, a former Swedish geographic division
  - Sollentuna Köping, a subdivision of the Sollentuna Hundred
- Sollentuna Kontrakt, a subdivision of the Church of Sweden Diocese of Stockholm
  - Sollentuna Parish, a parish in Sollentuna Kontrakt
    - Sollentuna Church, one of the church buildings in Sollentuna Parish
- Sollentuna Party, a local political party, active in the Sollentuna Municipality
- Sollentuna FK, a Swedish association football club
