= Sollentuna Hundred =

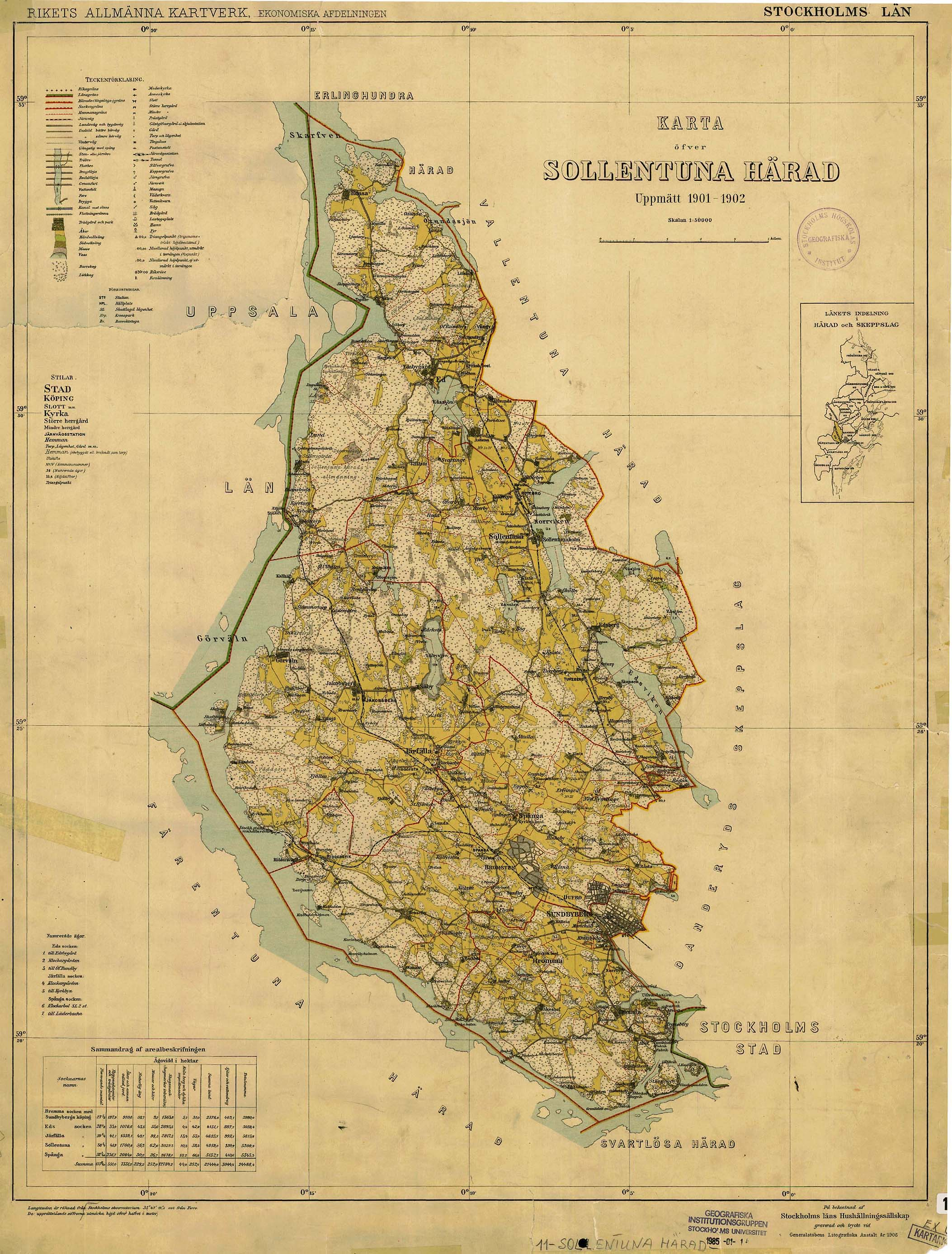
Sollentuna härad, 1901

Sollentuna Hundred (Swedish: Sollentuna härad) was a hundred of Uppland in Sweden. It encompassed the present-day municipalities of Järfälla, Sollentuna, and Sundbyberg as well as parts of Upplands Väsby Municipality (Eds socken) and Stockholm (Bromma and Spånga socken). All are now part of Stockholm County. The hundred had three köpingar—Sollentuna Köping, Sundbybergs Köping, and Hässelby Villastads Köping—and a number of municipalsamhällen. Most of the hundred is now part of the urban area of Stockholm, but the larger part of in the remainder is in Upplands Väsby. The total area was around 197 km^{2} and the population in 1916 was 20,727 people.

== Geography ==
Sollentuna Hundred was located directly west of Stockholm, in the borough of Bromma between Ulvsundasjön, Görväln, and Edsviken. Its easternmost parts lay in present-day central Stockholm (for example, the Essingen Islands). The geography is characteristic of the Mälaren Valley area: fertile clay soils in valleys divided by ridges of glacial till, and lakes such as Norrviken and Edsviken. The hundred was crossed by the Stockholmsåsen esker, which also serves as the watershed between Mälaren and Östersjön. The area is still noted for its natural beauty, particularly in the Järvafältet area, from whence the Bällstaån stream flows into Bällstaviken. Sollentuna Hundred was bordered to the south by the fjards of Näsfjärden and Lövstafjärden in Mälaren, with Färentuna Hundred located across the lake. Bro Hundred lay to the west, Ärlinghundra Hundred to the north, Vallentuna Hundred and Danderyd Ship District in the east, as well as Stockholm City and Svartlösa Hundred to the southeast.

== History ==
Sollentuna Hundred was one of the "eight hundreds" that composed the mediaeval Uppland folkland of Attundaland. The name, similar to that of neighbouring Vallentuna Hundred, was written as Sollendahundæri in the 14th century; the -enda- in the name signifies a place at the end of a lake. Sollentuna Church is indeed located by Norrviken lake, but it is also entirely possible that Sollenda paraphrases a much older word, perhaps meaning swamp or marshland, altered to imitate the name of the neighbouring hundred. The local ting originally met in Granby in Spånga socken, but moved to Barkarby in the 17th century, and finally to Rotebro in the 20th century. The hundred was long an important area for local and regional commerce. Roads leading to Bergslagen, Uppsala, and Roslagen crossed the isthmus between Norrviken and Edsviken. The lakes were crossed by important shipping routes, and there was also a harbour since the Viking Age.

In the 12th century, churches were founded in Sollentuna, Järfälla, Spånga, and Bromma. The hundred grew around these churches, growing from a few lone farms to a number of small villages. The majority of the population worked in agriculture until well towards the end of the 19th century. At that time, the Mälaren Line and Northern Main Line railways were built, and a number of station towns cropped up within the hundred, many of which today are part of the suburbs of Stockholm: for example, Sundbyberg, Bromsten, Jakobsberg, Tureberg, Rotebro, and Upplands Väsby. Sollentuna Hundred's proximity to the capital had a profound effect on its development and expansion in the first half of the 20th century. In 1916, Bromma socken and its towns were incorporated into the city, and Spånga socken followed suit in 1949.

== Sockens ==
Sollentuna Hundred was originally composed of five sockens:

- Bromma socken (became part of the City of Stockholm in 1916)
- Eds socken
- Järfälla socken
- Sollentuna socken
- Spånga socken (became part of the City of Stockholm in 1949)

== Administrative and judicial divisions ==
The hundred was part of Stockholm County since 1715 and also between the periods that it was part of Uppsala County (1634-1639, 1648–1651, 1654–1714).

The sockens in the hundred were part of the following bailiwicks:

- 1720-1852: Bailiwick of Sollentuna, Vallentuna, and Danderyd
- 1853-1881: Bailiwick of Sollentuna, Vallentuna, Färentuna, and Danderyd
- 1882-1885: Bailiwick of Färentuna and Sollentuna
- 1886-1966: Bailiwick of Svartsjö bailiwick (incl. Spånga socken until 1945 and Järfälla socken until 1948)
- 1946-1948: Bailiwick of Spånga (Spånga socken)
- 1949-1966: Bailiwick of Sundbyberg (Järfälla socken)
- 1967–present: Bailiwick of Sollentuna
- 1967–present: Bailiwick of Jakobsberg (Järfälla socken)

The sockens were also part of the following domsagor (judicial districts), tingslag, and tingsrätter (district courts):

- 1844-1915: Södra Roslag domsaga, with
  - 1844-1906: Sollentuna Hundred tingslag
  - 1907-1915: Tingslag of Södra Roslag domsaga
- 1916-1976: Sollentuna and Färentuna domsaga (until 1952 for Eds socken)
  - 1916-1951/1970: Tingslag of Sollentuna and Färentuna domsaga
- 1952-1976: Western Stockholm County domsaga (for Eds socken) with
  - 1952-1970: Tingslag of Western Stockholm County domsaga
- 1977–present: Sollentuna domsaga with Sollentuna tingsrätt (Sollentuna and Eds sockens)
- 1977–present: Jakobsberg domsaga with Jakobsbergs tingsrätt (Järfälla socken)

== Sources ==
- Nordisk familjebok, 2nd ed., vol. 26, 1917
- Beskrifning öfver Stockholms län, (accessed 9 March 2009)
- Svensk Etymologisk Ordbok, (accessed 11 March 2009)
- Sollentuna - en lång historia, (accessed 11 March 2009)
- Historisk landskapsanalys - Länsstyrelsen i Stockholms län (accessed 11 March 2009)
- National Archives Database for information on administrative and legal divisions

== See also ==
- Sollentuna Municipality
