= Sjöberg =

Sjöberg (variations in other versions of the Latin alphabet, Sjöberg or Sjøberg, or Americanized as Seaberg, Seaborg, Sjoberg or Showberg), is a Swedish surname which may refer to:

== People ==
=== Poets ===
- Birger Sjöberg (1885–1929), Swedish poet
- Erik Sjöberg (1794–1828), Swedish poet
- Nils Lorens Sjöberg (1754–1822), Swedish officer and poet

=== Sportspeople ===
- Axel Sjöberg (footballer, born 1991) (born 1991), Swedish footballer
- Axel Sjöberg (born 1995), Swedish curler
- Göran Sjöberg (born 1960), Swedish ice hockey player and coach
- Henrik Sjöberg (1875–1905), Swedish athlete and gymnast
- Johanna Sjöberg (born 1978), Swedish international swimmer
- Kjell Sjöberg (1937–2013), Swedish ski jumper
- Lars-Erik Sjöberg (1944–1987), Swedish ice hockey player
- Mathias Sjöberg (born 1988), Swedish ice hockey player
- Patrik Sjöberg (born 1965), Swedish high jumper
- Paul Sjöberg (1897–1978), Finnish Olympic sailor

=== Other people ===
- Alf Sjöberg (1903–1980), Swedish film director
- Carl Leopold Sjöberg (1861–1900), Swedish composer
- Emma Sjöberg (born 1968), Swedish fashion model and actress
- Erik Sjöberg (historian)
- Laura Sjoberg (born 1979), American scholar of feminist international relations theory
- Magnus Sjöberg (born 1927), Swedish jurist
- Nils Sjöberg, songwriting pseudonym used by Taylor Swift

== Other ==
- Sjöberg, Sweden, a small town in Sollentuna municipality, Sweden
