= Bromma socken =

Bromma socken may refer to:

- Bromma socken, Sollentuna Hundred, former socken in Sollentuna Hundred, Uppland
- Bromma socken, Herrestad Hundred, former socken in Herrestad Hundred, Skåne

== See also ==
- Bromma Parish
