= Rotebro IS =

Swedish football club

Rotebro IS FF
- Full name: Rotebro Idrottssällskap Fotbollförening
- Founded: 1918
- Ground: Skinnaråsens IP; Sollentuna; Sweden
- Capacity: 1,000
- Head coach: David Pinot
- League: Division 4 Herrar 4 Norra
- 2024: Division 5 Herrar 5 Norra. 3rd (Promoted)
Home colours	Away colours

Rotebro IS FF is a Swedish football club located in the northern Stockholm suburb of Rotebro, Sollentuna Municipality

== Background ==
Since its foundation Rotebro IS FF has participated mainly in the lower divisions of the Swedish football league system. The club currently plays in Division 4 Norra which is the 6th tier of Swedish football. They play their home matches at the Skinnaråsens IP in Sollentuna.

Rotebro IS are affiliated to the Stockholms Fotbollförbund.

== Season to season ==
Season	Level	Division	Section	Position	Movements
1999	Tier 6	Division 5	Stockholm Norra	8th	
2000	Tier 6	Division 5	Stockholm Norra	3rd	
2001	Tier 6	Division 5	Stockholm Norra	11th	Relegated
2002	Tier 7	Division 6	Stockholm A	1st	Promoted
2003	Tier 6	Division 5	Stockholm Norra	4th	
2004	Tier 6	Division 5	Stockholm Norra	7th	
2005	Tier 6	Division 5	Stockholm Norra	1st	Promoted
2006*	Tier 6	Division 4	Stockholm Norra	5th	
2007	Tier 6	Division 4	Stockholm Norra	2nd	Promotion Playoffs – Promoted
2008	Tier 5	Division 3	Södra Svealand	8th	
2009	Tier 5	Division 3	Norra Svealand	2nd	Promotion Playoffs – Promoted
2010	Tier 4	Division 2	Norra Svealand	4th	
2011	Tier 4	Division 2	Norra Svealand	8th	
2012	Tier 4	Division 2	Norra Svealand	10th	Relegation Playoffs
2013	Tier 4	Division 2	Norra Svealand	6th	
2014**	Tier 8	Division 6	Herrar 6 A	3rd	
2015	Tier 8	Division 6	Herrar 6 A	3rd	
2016	Tier 8	Division 6	Herrar 6 A	2nd	
2017	Tier 8	Division 6	Herrar 6 A	3rd	
2018	Tier 8	Division 6	Herrar 6 A	6th	
2019	Tier 8	Division 6	Herrar 6 A	2nd	Promoted
2020	Tier 7	Division 5	Herrar 5 Norra	11th	Relegated
2021	Tier 8	Division 6	Herrar 6 A	3rd	
2022	Tier 8	Division 6	Herrar 6 A	2nd	
2023	Tier 8	Division 6	Herrar 6 A	1st	Promoted
2024	Tier 7	Division 5	Herrar 5 Norra	3rd	Promoted
2025	Tier 6	Division 4	Herrar 4 Norra	6th	
2026	Tier 6	Division 4	Herrar 4 Norra	Ongoing	

* League restructuring in 2006 resulted in a new division being created at Tier 3 and subsequent divisions dropping a level.

** Economic trouble forced the club to withdraw the first team from Division 2 Norra Svealand ahead of the 2014 season. The youth team Rotebro Ungdom IS FF later became the new first team after the 2014 season.
