= Edsberg =

Edsberg may refer to the following places in Sweden:

- Edsberg, Sollentuna
- Edsberg Hundred, Närke
