= Linda Skugge =

Swedish journalist

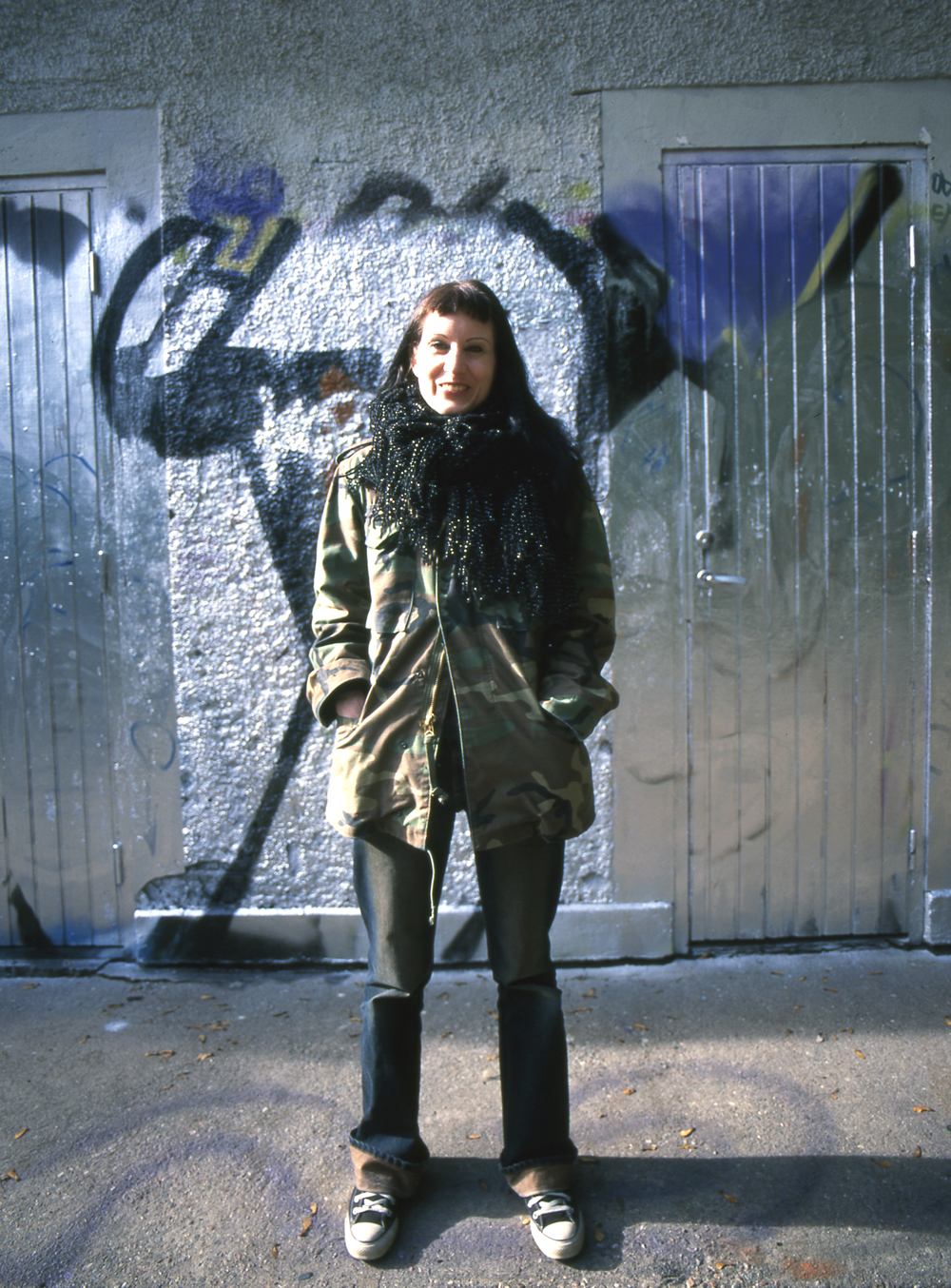
- Linda Skugge in Humlegården in Stockholm., Sweden
- Born: 9 October 1973 (age 52); Bromma, Sweden
- Occupations: author, journalist

Linda Ingrid Skugge (born Norrman, 9 October 1973 in Bromma, Stockholm) is a Swedish author and journalist (columnist). She has been a producer in theater Brunnsgatan 4 since 2012 and a head of events agency "Skugge & Co". She is writing articles for such media as Amelia,Chic, Icakuriren. Skugge lives in Sollentuna and is married to the musician Johan Skugge, with whom she has three daughters. Her career began in 1991 when she worked for the youth magazine Ultra Magazine. In 1993 she became a weekly columnist for Expressen. After many years of advocating feminism, in April 2006 Skugge suddenly announced that she would not call herself a feminist anymore. She also advised any girls who wanted a career to stop using that word. Linda Skugge also has a blog, which was the most read private blog in Sweden in January 2007. 2008 she started blogging for the Swedish magazine Amelia.

She also is known to be a publisher of Constant Reader drivers. Linda has some awards the likes of Årets Mama 2004 for her publications in the magazine "Mama", "Haros prize" 2007 and "Amningshjälpens" award in 2008.

She was preparing a horror series "Himmelsberg" with the original idea of both Sigrid Tollgård and Linda Skugge and cooperation with Erika Stark. The first 8 episodes of the new series were issued on 27 October 2017 on Sweden Radio Play channel. At the moment she is writing a new play about the youth problems which will be released in the theater of Göteborg.

== Bibliography ==
- Lindas samlade (1996)
- Saker under huden (1998)
- Fittstim (tillsammans med Belinda Olsson) (1999)
- Det här är inte en bok (2001)
- Akta er killar här kommer Gud! Och hon är jävligt förbannad (2003)
- Lilla Ångestboken (2003)
- Men mest av allt vill jag hångla med nån, Linda Skugges dagbok 91–93 (2004)
- Saker under huden (återutgåva) (2005)
- Ett tal till min systers bröllop (2006)
- Lindas bästa/värsta (2008)
- 1989 – leva eller överleva (2013), co-arthor with Sigrid Tollgård.
- 40 – constant reader (2014).
