= Seaborg =

Seaborg may refer to:

- Glenn T. Seaborg (1912–1999), American nuclear chemist, gave name to chemical element seaborgium
- Helen L. Seaborg (1917–2006), American child welfare advocate and wife of Glenn T. Seaborg
- David Seaborg (born 1949), American evolutionary biologist and activist, son of Glenn and Helen
- Seaborg Home, family home of Glenn T. Seaborg, in South Gate, California
- Seaborg Technologies, a Danish-based company developing small molten salt reactors

== See also ==
- Seaborgium (_{106}Sg), a chemical element
- List of things named after Glenn T. Seaborg
- Sjöberg (disambiguation)
