= Battle of Rotebro =

Late 15th Century conflict between Denmark and Sweden

- Part of Dano–Swedish War
Date	28 September 1497
Location	Rotebro, Sweden
Result	Danish victory: King John becomes king of Sweden

Belligerents
Denmark	Sweden

Commanders and leaders
John of Denmark	Sten Sture the Elder

The Battle of Rotebro was fought on 28 September 1497 between the armies of John, King of Denmark and Sten Sture the Elder, the deposed regent of Sweden. Sten Sture had fallen out of favor with the nobility and was deposed on March 1497 of his post as Regent of Sweden. The Danes invaded Sweden in July of that year, and defeated Sten's peasant army on 28 September at the village of Rotebro north of Stockholm.

The battle was between men from Dalarna loyal to the Swedish governor Sten Sture the Elder and troops loyal to the Kalmar union. John, King of Denmark, emerged victorious from the battle after his cavalry mowed down Sten Sture's band of peasants, who tried to flee across the Edsån towards the Rotebro redoubt.

After the loss, after negotiations with King Hans and the Riksdag, Sten Sture relinquished the post of Riksdag, was relieved of responsibility and received fiefs.

The result was that King John was finally able to make a ceremonial entry into Stockholm and be crowned in the Storkyrkan with the Swedish royal crown that he had received fourteen years earlier through the Kalmar recess in 1483.
