= 2007 Hitman case =

Australian criminal case

The 2007 hitman case is an Australian criminal case involving Steven Wayne Spaliviero and Swede Charlotte Karin Lindström. Lindström is so far the only one sentenced for the crime. Spaliviero served 11 years in prison and was released October 2017, but was never charged for the hitman case. The hitman case has been widely reported by media in Australia and Scandinavia.

== Charlotte Lindström ==
Charlotte Karin Lindström (born 9 August 1984 in Sollentuna, Sweden) is a former waitress, promotion model, and former prisoner having spent three years in a Sydney jail after being arrested on 26 May 2007 in Sydney, in Australia on suspicion of trying to hire a hitman to kill two men who were about to testify against her boyfriend Steven Spaliviero in court.

== Case ==
Lindström arrived in Sydney in 2004 working as a part-time model as well as a waitress in the exclusive nightclub Hemmesphere in Sydney.

In Sydney, Lindström met Steven Spaliviero and they soon started a relationship living in an apartment in Darling Harbour. Lindström later told the court that she soon realised that he was both a wealthy businessman and a drug dealer. In early 2007, investigators started to look into Spaliviero's business and soon found two witnesses who said they had information about the man's drug dealing business. At that time Spaliviero was already on bail from Melbourne in relation to another drug case. Spaliviero was arrested, refused bail and sent to Metropolitan Remand and Reception Centre ("MRRC") in Silverwater, New South Wales.

== Murder plot ==
In MRRC, Spaliviero allegedly met another inmate who offered him to get witnesses in Spaliviero's case killed. In relation to this, Spaliviero phoned Lindström from MRRC telling her to meet a "solicitor" and give him money.

Lindström started acting upon instructions from Spaliviero. When Lindström finally met who she thought was a hitman, but who in reality was an undercover police officer, she was arrested. The police officer on the case stated that Lindström wanted to have two men taken to the "cemetery" which meant she wanted them dead. The price was agreed as A$100,000 for each contract.

Upon her arrest on 26 May Lindström was remanded in custody. Later an application for bail was made where Steven Spaliviero's mother, Dolores Spaliviero, offered to put up A$2,000,000 surety to get Lindström out from custody. In addition, Lindström's friend and employer, Justin Hemmes provided an undertaking that if Lindström was set free on bail, he would let her continue her work at the Hemmesphere nightclub until the trial. The application for bail was denied due to flight risk and Lindström was remanded in custody.

On 18 September, having had a deal made with the prosecutors Lindström pleaded guilty to the charges. On 21 December, she pleaded guilty in another court in Sydney. Lindström appeared in a bullet-proof vest at her court hearings because of the alleged death threats against her.

Lindström was initially sentenced to four years in jail being eligible for early parole on 25 May 2009. Even though Lindström was given a hefty discount from her sentence because she had agreed to testify against Steven Spaliviero and two other men, the Crown appealed against the sentence as "manifestly inadequate". The criminal court of appeals heard the appeal on 4 July 2008.

On 23 July 2008, her maximum sentence was increased from three years and ten months to four years and nine months, making her eligible for parole in May 2010. On 11 August 2008, Lindström started testifying against Spaliviero in his court case, even reading a love letter to the court which she had written to him in February 2007, some months before her own arrest.

Despite Lindström's extensive testimonies, Spaliviero and two other defendants were found not guilty for the murder plot.

Lindström was released on parole from Long Bay jail in New South Wales on 25 May 2010 and deported the next day from Australia.

Since her release from prison, Lindström has returned to her native home Sweden and is understood to have had ongoing threats against her life.

According to the Australian media, on 15 August 2010, Charlotte Lindström agreed to return to Australia to testify in the trial of Spaliviero's associate. Due to an unspecified severe illness, she has not been allowed to travel to Australia. The upcoming trial has been postponed.

== Court hearings after sentence ==
On 11 August 2008, Lindström was in court reading the love letter she wrote to Steven in February 2007, some months before her own arrest.

In June 2009, Lindström started to testify against Spaliviero in a Sydney courtroom. A video of Lindströms 2007 arrest in Sydney was also released to the media. However, in July 2009 Steven Spaliviero and two suspected accomplices were found not guilty of conspiracy to murder the witnesses.

== Media ==
In November, a few months after being released Charlotte Lindström appeared on the Australian 60 Minutes on Channel 9 telling about her time in jail and about how she could do the crime she was sentenced for.

Channel 9 in Australia aired a documentary on 6 September 2011 concentrating on Charlotte Lindström's murder plot. According to the article in The Sydney Morning Herald Charlotte Lindström "no longer has feelings for" Steven Spaliviero.

Steven Spaliviero published a book in 2017 called Narco X about his criminal past and his relationship with Lindström.
