= Sjöberg, Sweden =

Sjöberg
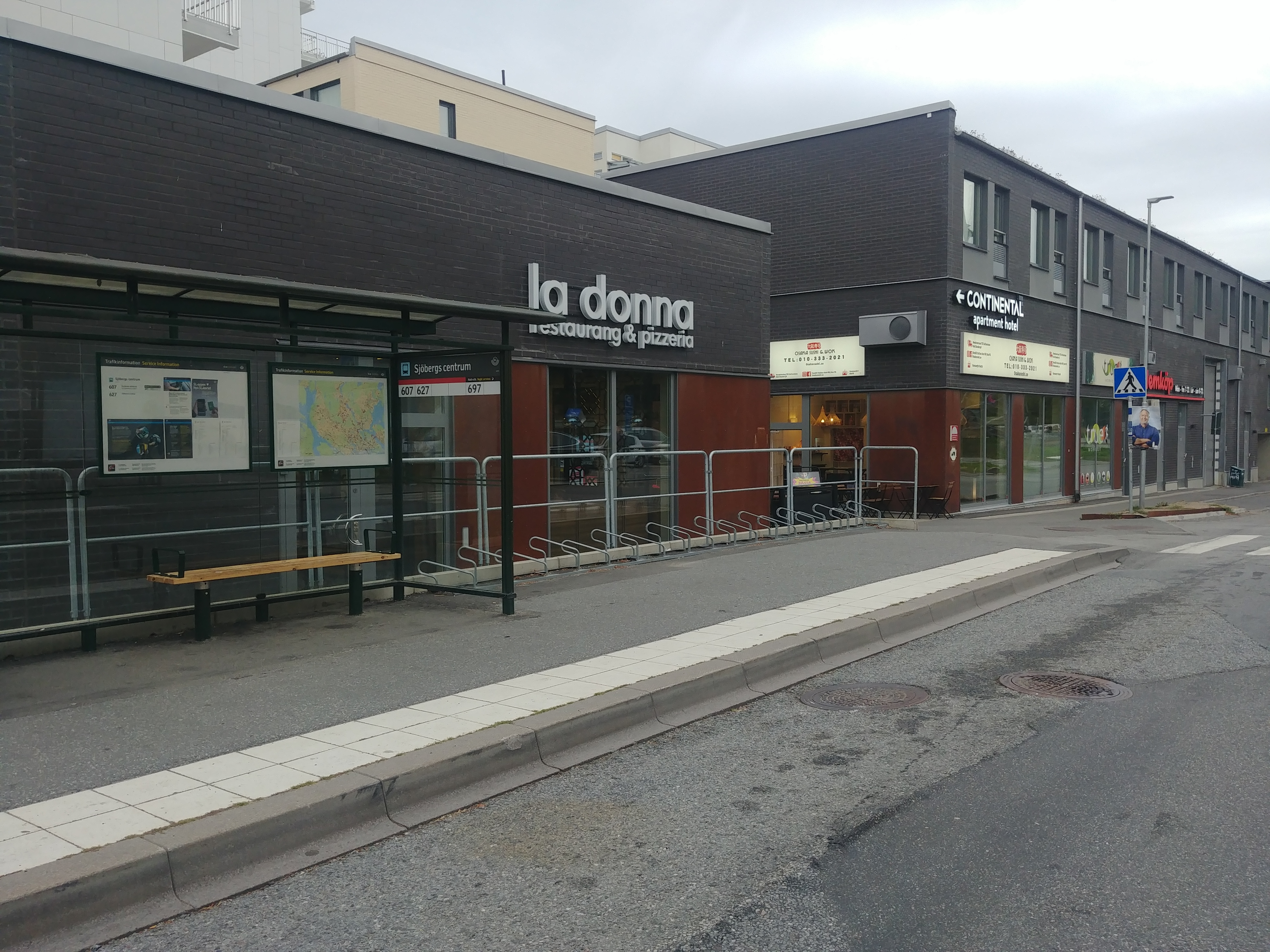
- Center of Sjöberg

- Location within Stockholm Location within Sweden Location within European Union
- Coordinates: 59°26′N 18°00′E
- Country: Sweden
- Province: Uppland
- County: Stockholm County
- Municipality: Sollentuna Municipality

Area
  - Total: 1.39 km^{2} (0.54 sq mi)

Population (31 December 2010)
  - Total: 4,310
  - Density: 3,103/km^{2} (8,040/sq mi)
- Time zone: UTC+1 (CET)
  - Summer (DST): UTC+2 (CEST)

Sjöberg is a locality situated in Sollentuna Municipality, Stockholm County, Sweden with 4,627 inhabitants as of december 2011.

Sjöberg is the most eastern district in the Sollentuna Municipality where it borders Edsberg district to the west and Danderyd Municipality to the east. It is located along the Edsviken inlet.

== Sjöberg Center ==
The center of Sjöberg was constructed in the 1970's as the local residential area Kärrdal was being built. The center consisted of grocery stores, restaurants and more.

The center was reconstructed in 2020 and was finished in 2021 consisting of new buildings, as well as apartment hotels.

In the current center there exists restaurants, a grocery store, a gym and a cafe. There is also a bus stop near the center and two schools near as well.
