= Sollentuna Church =

Church in Sollentuna Municipality, Sweden

Coordinates: 59°28′00″N 17°55′06″E

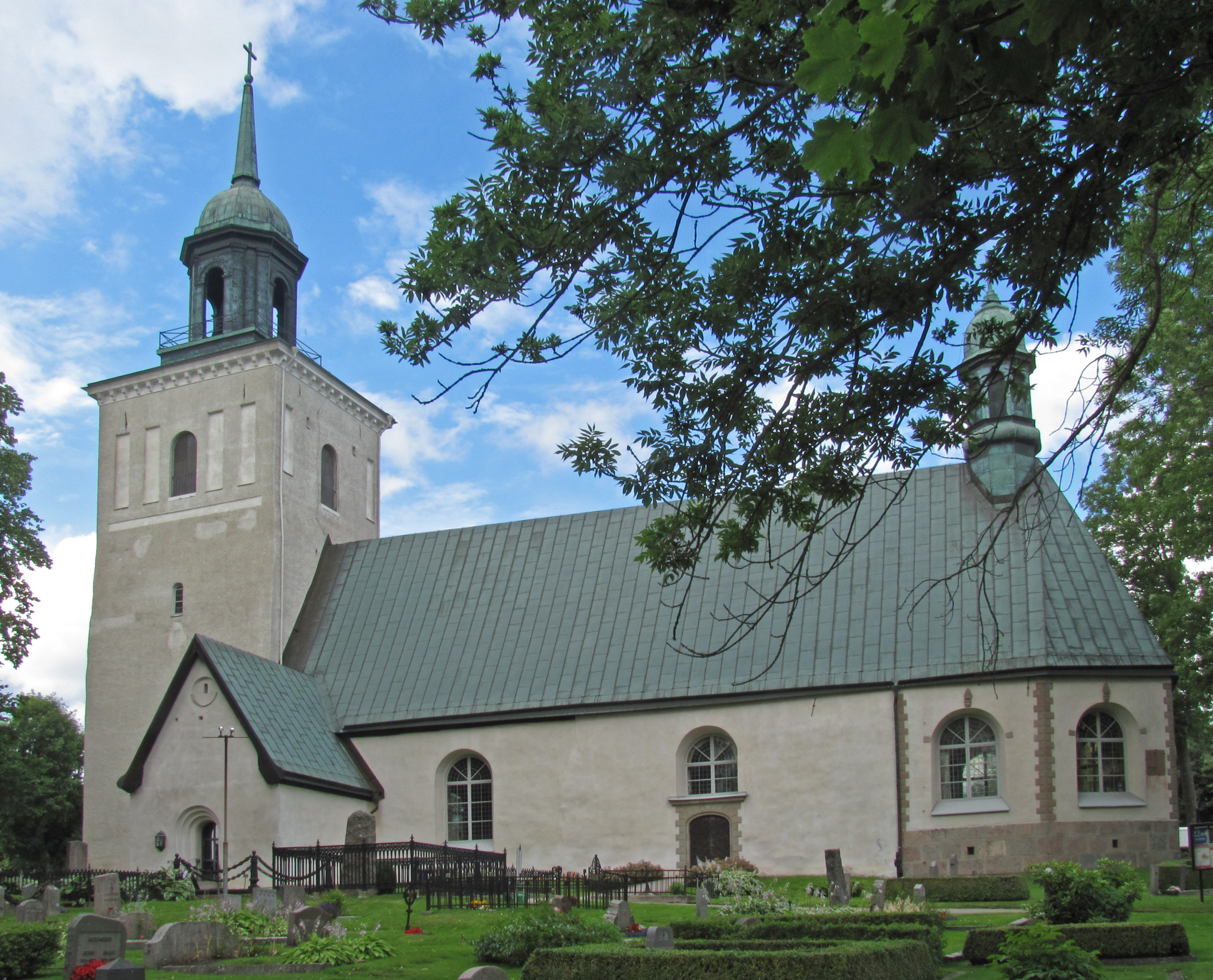

Sollentuna Church is located in Sollentuna Municipality. It is one of the churches in Sollentuna Parish.

A partial runic inscription, designated Upplands runinskrifter 95, appears on the side of the church.
