= Mathias Sjöberg =

Swedish ice hockey player

- Born: September 15, 1988 (age 38) Finja, Sweden
- Height: 6 ft 0 in (183 cm)
- Weight: 211 lb (96 kg; 15 st 1 lb)
- Position: Defence
- Shot: Left
- Played for: Tyringe SoSS; Kristianstads IK; Rögle BK; IF Troja-Ljungby
- Playing career: 2008–2022

Mathias Sjöberg (born September 15, 1988, in Finja) is a Swedish ice hockey player. He is currently playing with the Tyringe SOS in the Swedish Division 2.

He has played in the Swedish Elitserien with Rögle BK, but decided to move back home and play in a lower division because he missed doing things like fishing and hunting that he did not have time to do while playing in a high division.

He has also played hockey in Frölunda J20.

== Career statistics ==
			Regular season					Playoffs
Season	Team	League	GP	G	A	Pts	PIM	GP	G	A	Pts	PIM
2003–04	Tyringe SoSS J20	J20 Div.2	—	—	—	—	—	—	—	—	—	—
2004–05	Tyringe SoSS	Division 1	16	0	0	0	8	—	—	—	—	—
2004–05	Frölunda HC J18	J18 Allsvenskan	8	0	1	1	10	7	0	0	0	8
2004–05	Frölunda HC J20	U20 Nationell	5	0	1	1	4	—	—	—	—	—
2005–06	Tyringe SoSS	Division 1	33	0	3	3	40	—	—	—	—	—
2006–07	Tyringe SoSS	Division 1	24	3	6	9	46	—	—	—	—	—
2006–07	Kristianstads IK	Division 1	16	3	3	6	8	—	—	—	—	—
2007–08	Kristianstads IK J20	J20 Elit	2	0	1	1	0	—	—	—	—	—
2007–08	Kristianstads IK	Division 1	27	4	7	11	22	—	—	—	—	—
2007–08	Rögle BK J20	J20 SuperElit	12	2	6	8	18	2	0	0	0	0
2007–08	Rögle BK	HockeyAllsvenskan	12	0	1	1	0	10	0	0	0	2
2008–09	Rögle BK J20	J20 SuperElit	3	0	1	1	0	—	—	—	—	—
2008–09	Rögle BK	Elitserien	31	2	0	2	14	—	—	—	—	—
2008–09	Kristianstads IK	Division 1	17	1	2	3	36	—	—	—	—	—
2009–10	Rögle BK J20	J20 SuperElit	7	3	2	5	4	—	—	—	—	—
2009–10	Rögle BK	Elitserien	17	0	0	0	4	—	—	—	—	—
2009–10	IF Troja-Ljungby	HockeyAllsvenskan	3	0	0	0	2	—	—	—	—	—
2009–10	Tyringe SoSS	Division 2	—	6	10	16	—	4	2	1	3	—
2010–11	Tyringe SoSS	Division 2	12	2	3	5	8	11	0	2	2	18
2011–12	Tyringe SoSS	Division 2	30	3	24	27	49	13	3	3	6	8
2012–13	Kristianstads IK	Hockeyettan	23	1	2	3	8	—	—	—	—	—
2012–13	Tyringe SoSS	Division 2	18	6	11	17	34	13	4	2	6	10
2013–14	Tyringe SoSS J20	U20 Div.1	2	1	1	2	0	—	—	—	—	—
2013–14	Tyringe SoSS	Division 2	28	10	14	24	48	15	3	4	7	14
2014–15	Tyringe SoSS	Division 2	29	8	14	22	12	8	3	5	8	4
2014–15	Kristianstads IK	Hockeyettan	3	0	0	0	0	—	—	—	—	—
2015–16	Tyringe SoSS	Hockeyettan	9	0	0	0	6	—	—	—	—	—
2016–17	Tyringe SoSS	Hockeyettan	33	2	10	12	16	—	—	—	—	—
2017–18	Tyringe SoSS	Hockeyettan	2	0	0	0	0	—	—	—	—	—
2019–20	Tyringe SoSS	Hockeyettan	3	1	2	3	2	—	—	—	—	—
2021–22	Tyringe SoSS	Division 2	7	0	0	0	0	—	—	—	—	—
Elitserien totals			48	2	0	2	18	—	—	—	—	—
HockeyAllsvenskan totals			15	0	1	1	2	10	0	0	0	2
Hockeyettan/Division 1 totals			206	15	35	50	192	—	—	—	—	—
