= Stockholmsåsen =

Esker in Stockholm county, Sweden

Stockholmsåsen, is a 60 kilometres (37 mi) long esker stretching from southern Uppland to northeastern Södermanland, in Stockholm County, Sweden. The esker extends from Arlanda to Jordbro and Västerhaninge, passing through Stockholm where it is known as Brunkebergsåsen.

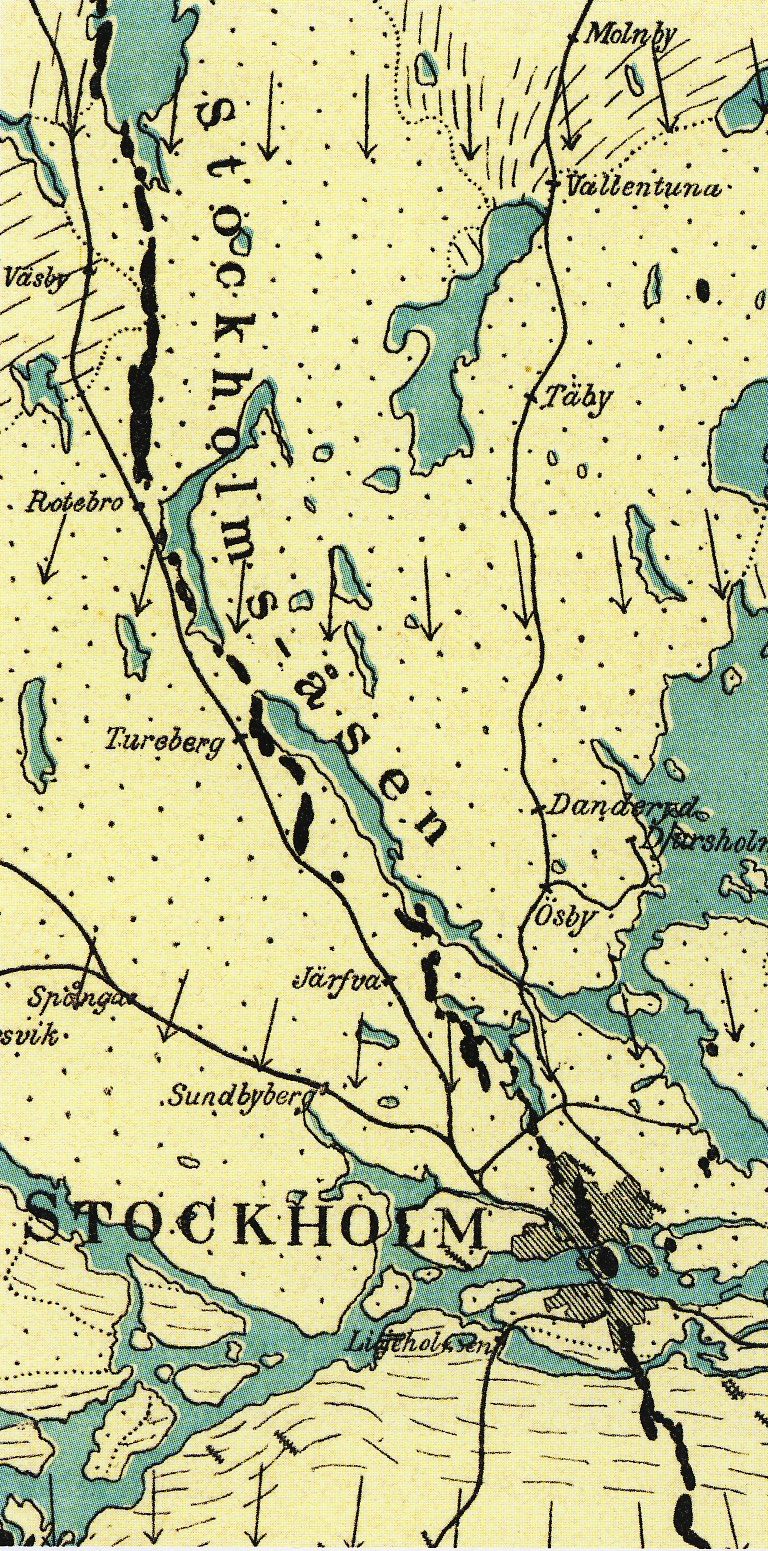
The bedrock and eskters of the Stockholm area according to the geologist Gerard De Geer 1897.

== See also ==
- Brunkebergsåsen
