= Bromma socken, Sollentuna Hundred =

Coordinates: 59°21′16″N 17°55′15″E

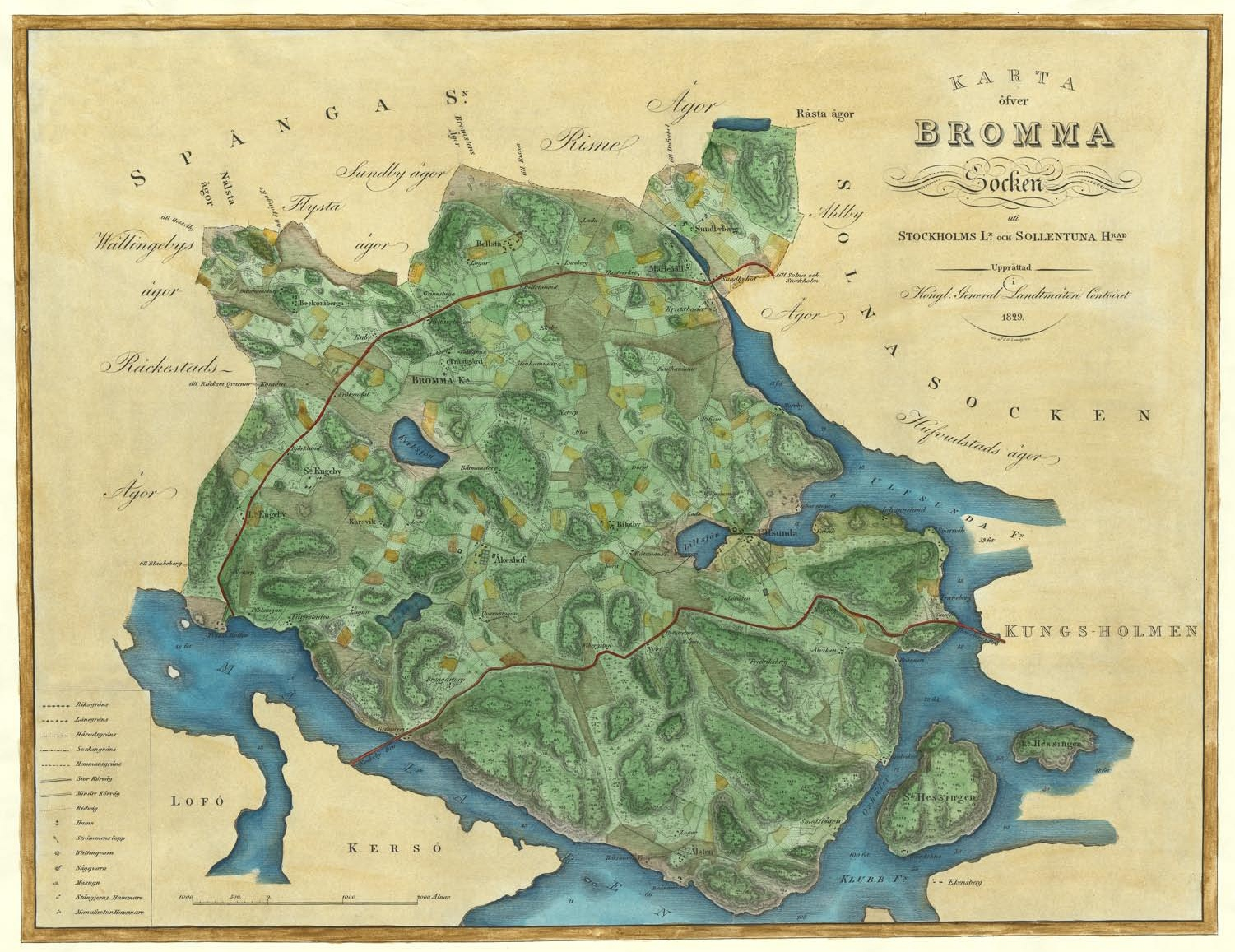
1829 map of Bromma Parish

Bromma socken is a former socken of Sollentuna Hundred in Uppland, Sweden. It became part of City of Stockholm in 1916, and has been part of the municipalities of Stockholm and Sundbyberg since 1971.

The socken was about 25.05 square kilometres (9.67 sq mi) in area. In 1903, the population was 2,220, before Sundbybergs köping (pop. 3,031) was included. Ulvsunda Castle, Åkeshov Castle, the Johannelund estate, and Bromma Church were located in the former socken.

== Etymology ==
The name of the socken (in 1344 Brumum) derives from the name of the kyrkby, the village or hamlet adjacent to the church. The word is of unclear meaning, perhaps from brumma, 'place for curing/drying leaves (e.g. for fodder)'. An alternative etymology proposes that the name is onomatopoetic, describing the murmuring "brumma" sound of a lake or harbour.

== Geography ==
Bromma socken was located west of Stockholm, with Lake Mälaren to the south, Ulvsundasjön to the east, and Bällstaviken with Bällstaån Stream to the northeast. The smaller lakes of Lillsjön, Judarn, and Kyrksjön were located in the socken. The terrain in the north of the socken was predominantly flat plains, with hilly woodland in the south.

== Administrative history ==
Bromma socken is first found in written records in 1314 (as De Brumum). Older still, Bromma Church dates back to the 12th century.

With the municipality reform of 1862, the ecclesiastical administration of the socken was turned over to Bromma Parish of the Church of Sweden, while secular responsibility fell under the jurisdiction of Bromma landskommun. In 1888, Sundbybergs köping was separated from the landskommun. Bromma landskommun was incorporated into Stockholm in 1916. On 1 May 1909, the ecclesiastical parish of Sundbyberg was separated from Bromma, and the ecclesiastical parishes of Västerled and Essingen followed suit in 1955.

Men from the socken were conscripted into the Life Regiment Dragoons Corps. Sailors were conscripted into the Södra Roslags 2:a båtsmanskompani.
