= Tureberg =

Area of Sollentuna Municipality, Sweden

Coordinates: 59°25′43″N 17°56′09″E

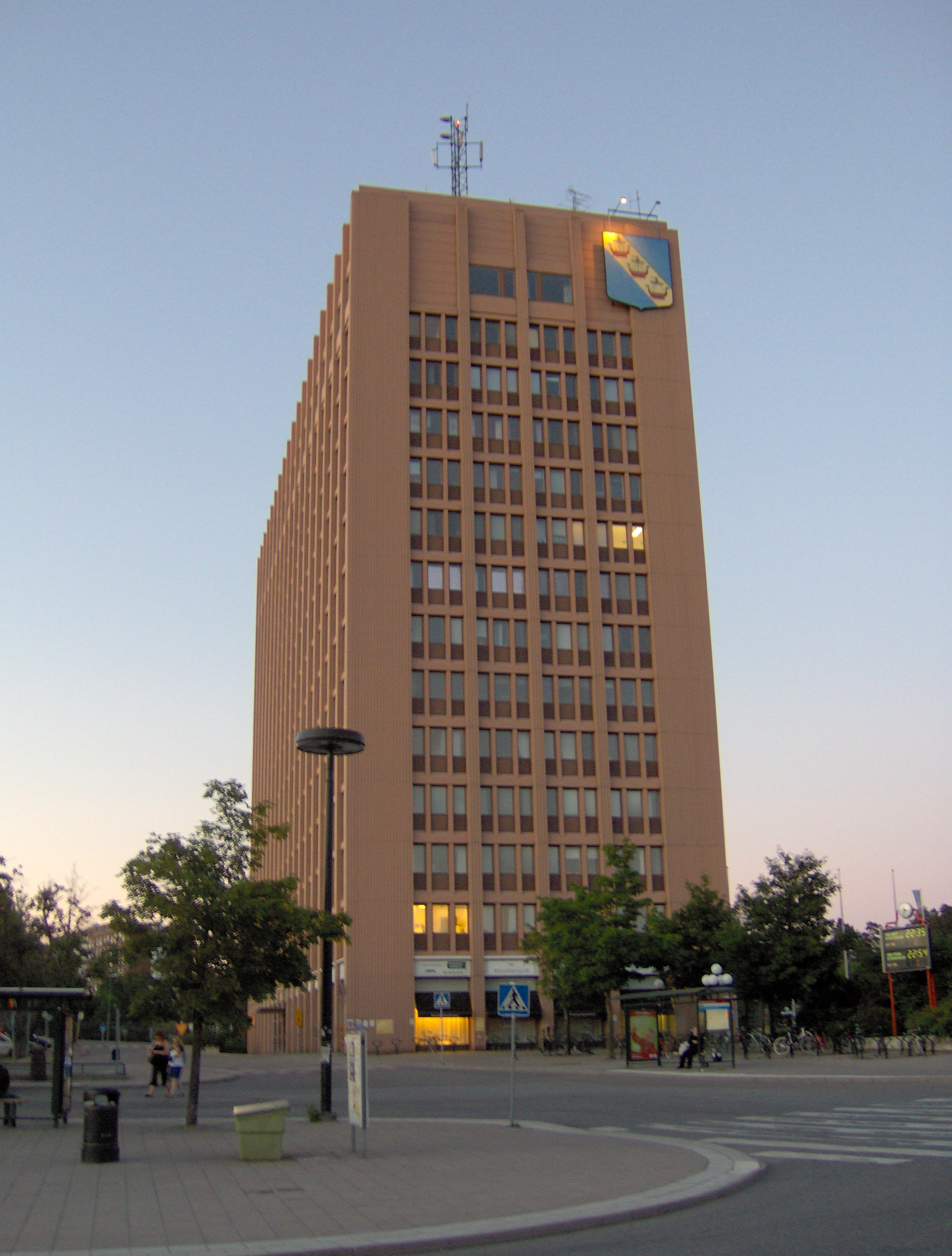
"The Tureberg Building" is the seat of local government of Sollentuna Municipality

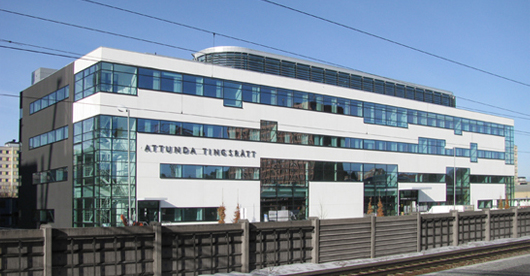
The courthouse

Tureberg is a neighbourhood in Sollentuna Municipality, Stockholm County, Sweden with 18,866 inhabitants (2018). It is a Stockholm suburb and houses the seat of local government for the municipality as well as a large shopping mall and a Stockholm commuter rail station.

Tureberg has also evolved as a law enforcement center for the northern part of metropolitan Stockholm, with police station, court house, prosecutor's office, and a jail, all in buildings built in the 1980s and onwards. The present courthouse was inaugurated in 2010.

Tureberg is a Risk area.
