= Edsviken =

Inlet of the Baltic Sea in Sweden

Coordinates: 59°25′19″N 17°59′15″E

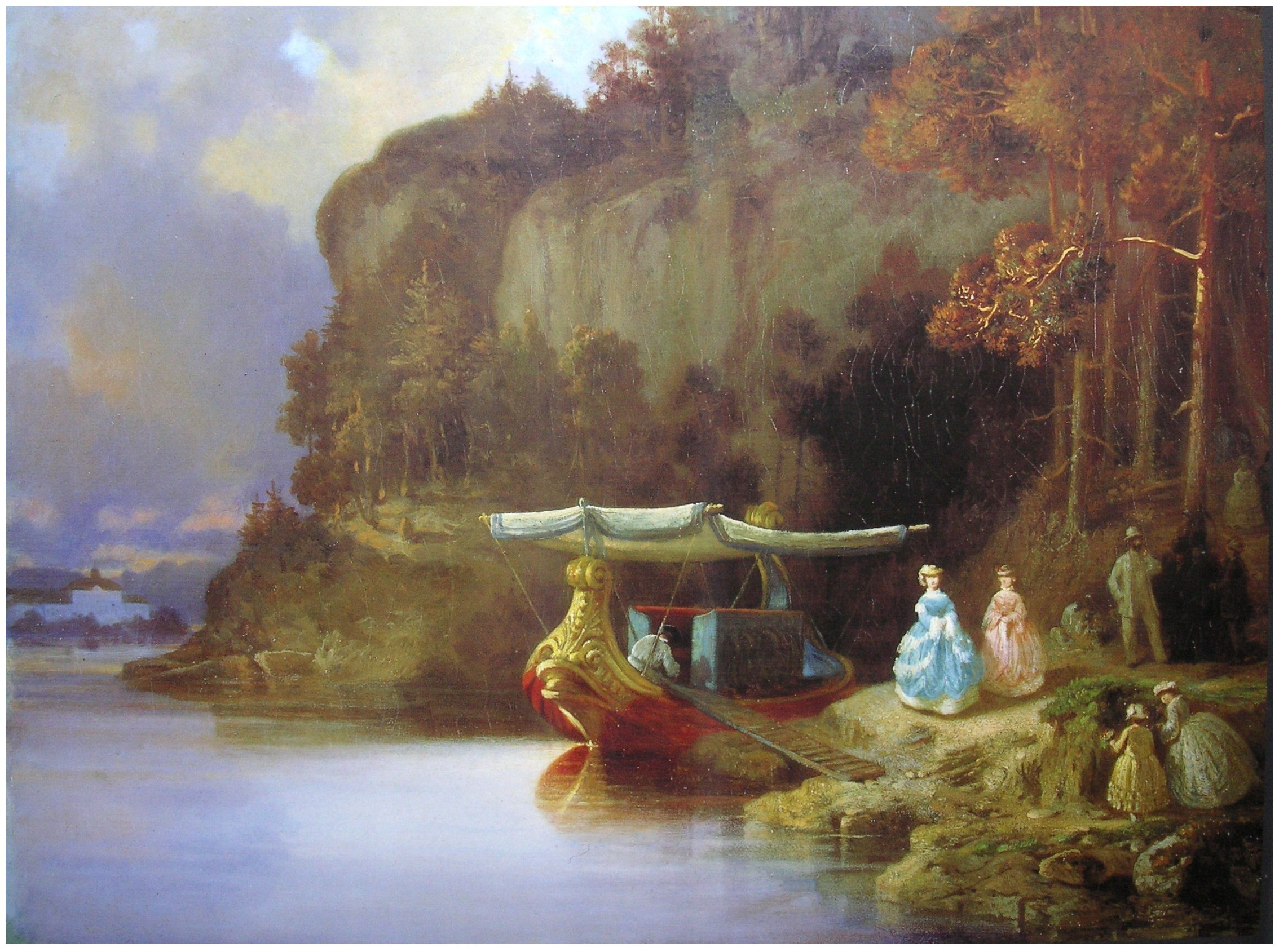
Utsikt över Edsviken (View of Edsviken) by Johan Christoffer Boklund, 1865

Edsviken is an elongated, narrow inlet of the Baltic Sea running through the Swedish municipalities of Danderyd, Solna and Sollentuna in Stockholm County. Edsviken ranges from Stocksund and Bergshamra, Solna in the south to Edsberg in the north. The inlet is about 7.7 km (4.8 mi) long with an area of approximately 3.6 km^{2} (1.4 sq mi); its maximum depth is around 20 m (65 ft 7 in). Edsviken joins the Stocksundet at Bergshamra and eventually flows into the Lilla Värtan.

Edsviken is a popular waterway. It is used by anglers, boat owners, and bathers in the summer, as well as ice skaters during the winter.

With its brackish water, the Edsviken offers a unique environment for its flora and fauna. Various coastal and wetland plants grow around the Edsviken, including water forget-me-not—a rare plant in Sweden—Bolboschoenus maritimus and seaweed. The Eurasian oystercatcher and the barnacle goose both nest on the Edsviken, which also has a wide variety of fish species, including: perch, bream, pike, ruffe, zander and the occasional herring.

The Edsviken's waterside is only partially developed. Waterfront buildings include the Danderyds sjukhus, Ulriksdal Palace, the Sollentuna hill fort, Edsbergs Castle, Kevinge gård and Stockholm golf club. The southwestern portion forms part of the Royal National City Park.

The sediment on the bottom of the inlet has been studied.
