= Sollentuna köping =

Coordinates: 59°26′N 17°57′E

Sollentuna Köping was a köping in Sollentuna Hundred. In 1971, it was reformed into Sollentuna Municipality.
