= Rotebro =

Urban area in Sollentuna Municipality, Sweden

Coordinates: 59°28′35″N 17°54′50″E

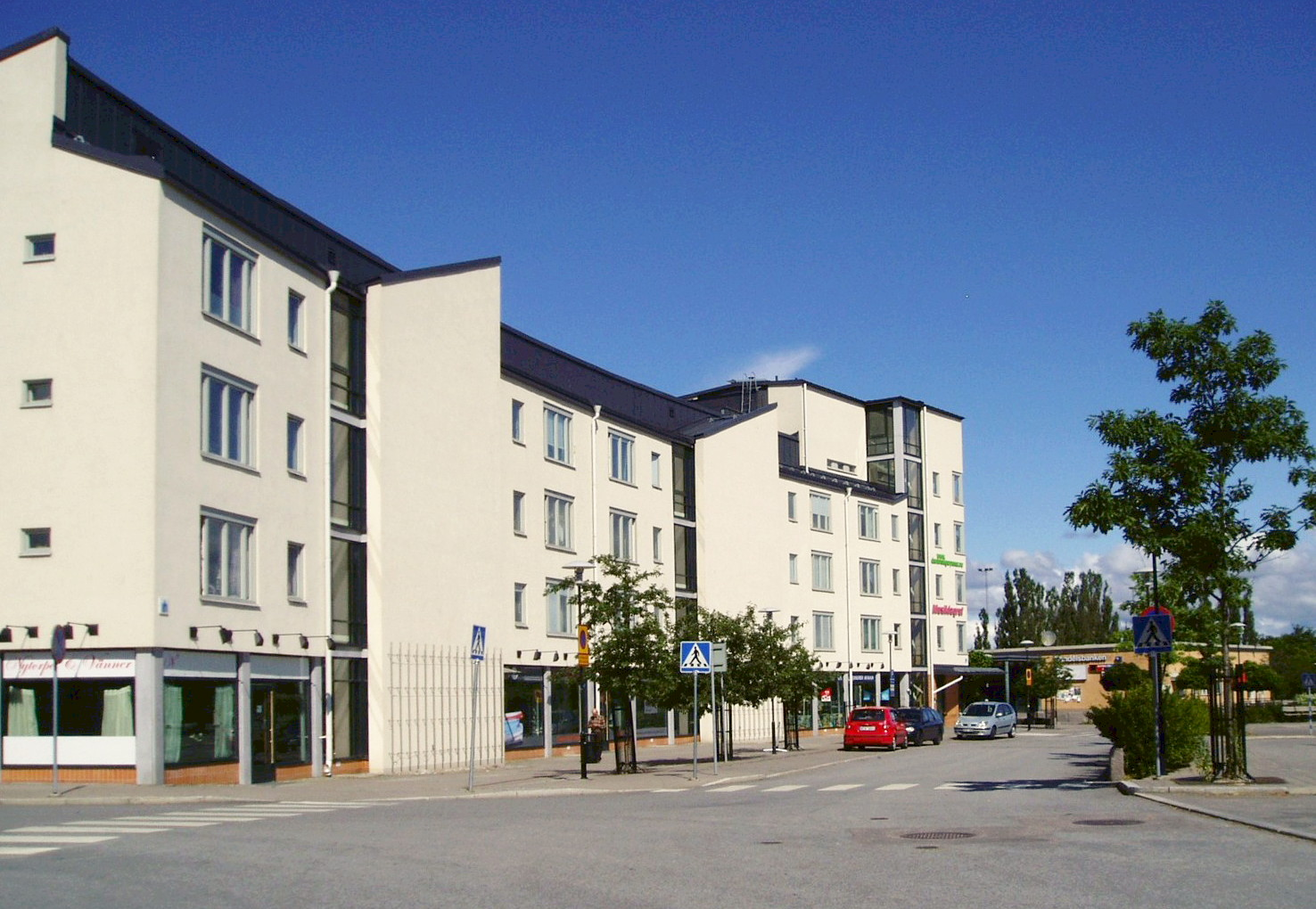
Rotebro

Rotebro is a neighbourhood of Sollentuna Municipality, Stockholm County, Sweden, and is part of Stockholm. It is divided into two parts, Rotsunda and Gillbo, by the railway.

Rotebro is located in the northernmost part of Sollentuna Municipality. In the 1890s, a yeast factory moved there from Alkärret, Brunnsviken. Wesströms tool factory (near lake Norrviken) and Goljes rubber factory were other important businesses in the area.

The names Rotebro and Rotsunda were formed from a bridge (Sw. bro) spanning a strait (Sw. sund). The bridge was used in times of unrest as a meeting point for troops. The river Edsån joins lake Edssjön and lake Norrviken. Originally, the river was a canal, which was dug through the marshland in the 19th century to drain it and free more arable land. North of the river is a hill with a hill fort from the Battle of Rotebro in 1497, when troops loyal to Sten Sture the Elder lost a battle against the Danish army led by Hans of Denmark, which included forces from Uppland.

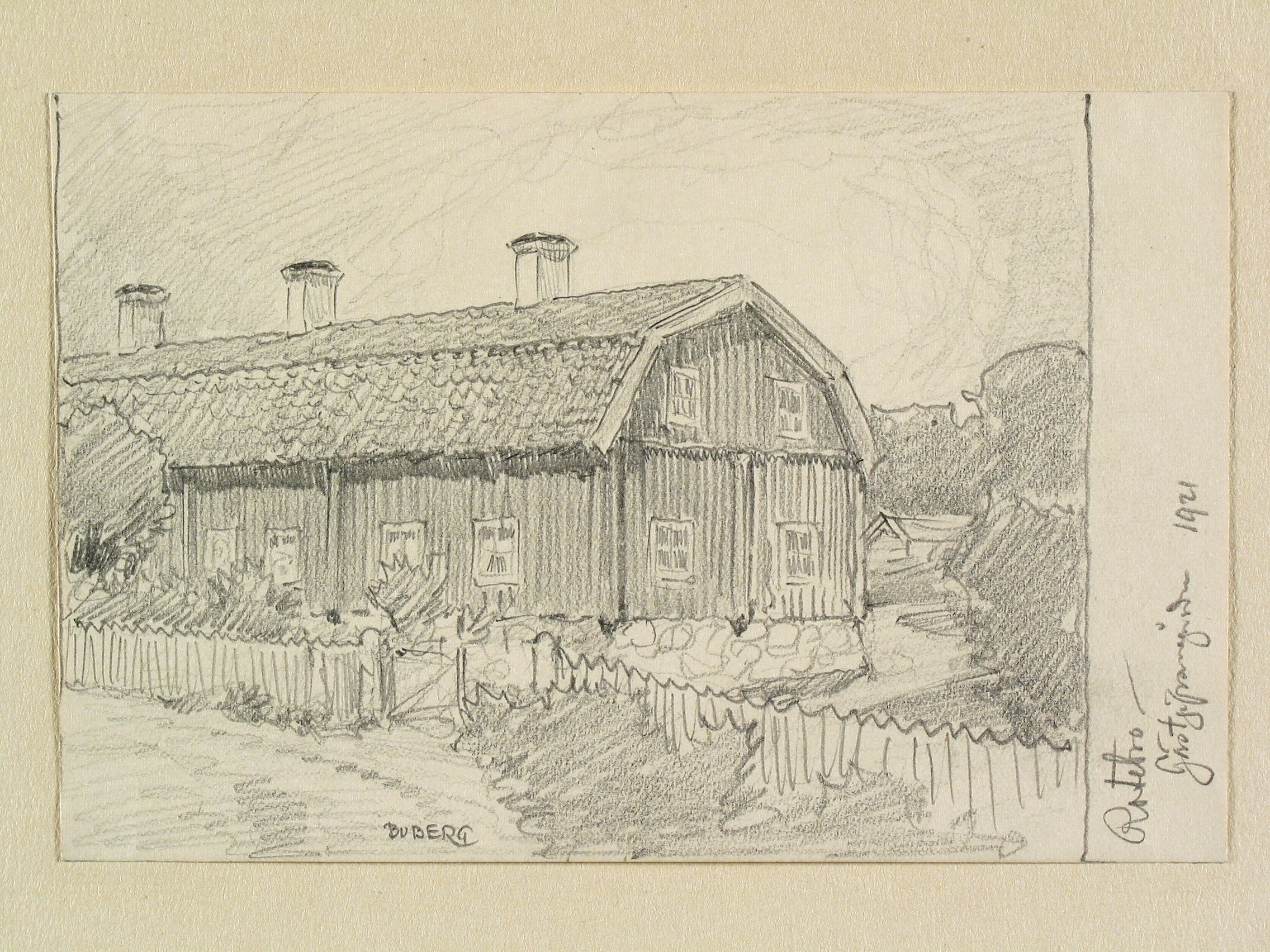
The inn at Rotebro, drawn by Ferdinand Boberg in 1921.

Near the bridge over Edsån an inn was located, which was destroyed in a fire in 1971. In the 19th century, the painter August Malmström sometimes stayed in this inn; his painting Grindslanten from 1885 depicts a fight by a gate in Rotebro.

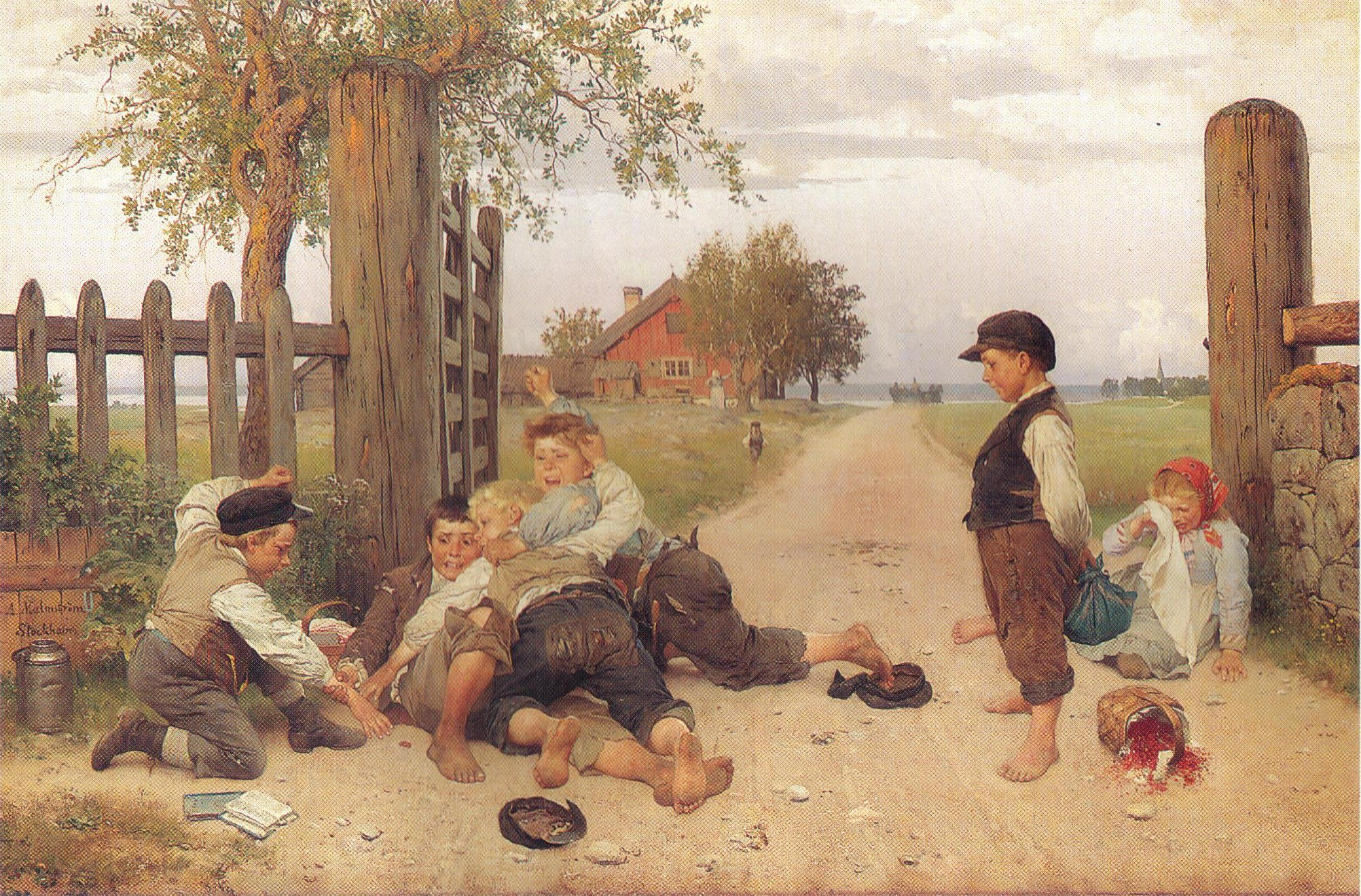
Grindslanten

Rotebro has a station on the Stockholm commuter rail system, 19 km north of Stockholm Central Station.

== Sports ==
Rotebro has three golf courses, which are used for cross-country ski tracks in the winter. The sports alliance Rotebro IS has sections for football, floorball and orienteering.

== Notable people ==
- Patric Hörnqvist, professional ice hockey player was born and raised in Rotebro
- Christer Pettersson, who for a time was the chief suspect for the murder of Swedish prime minister Olof Palme, lived here
