= Edsberg, Sollentuna =

Urban district in Sollentuna Municipality, Stockholm County, Sweden

Coordinates: 59°26′46″N 17°57′58″E

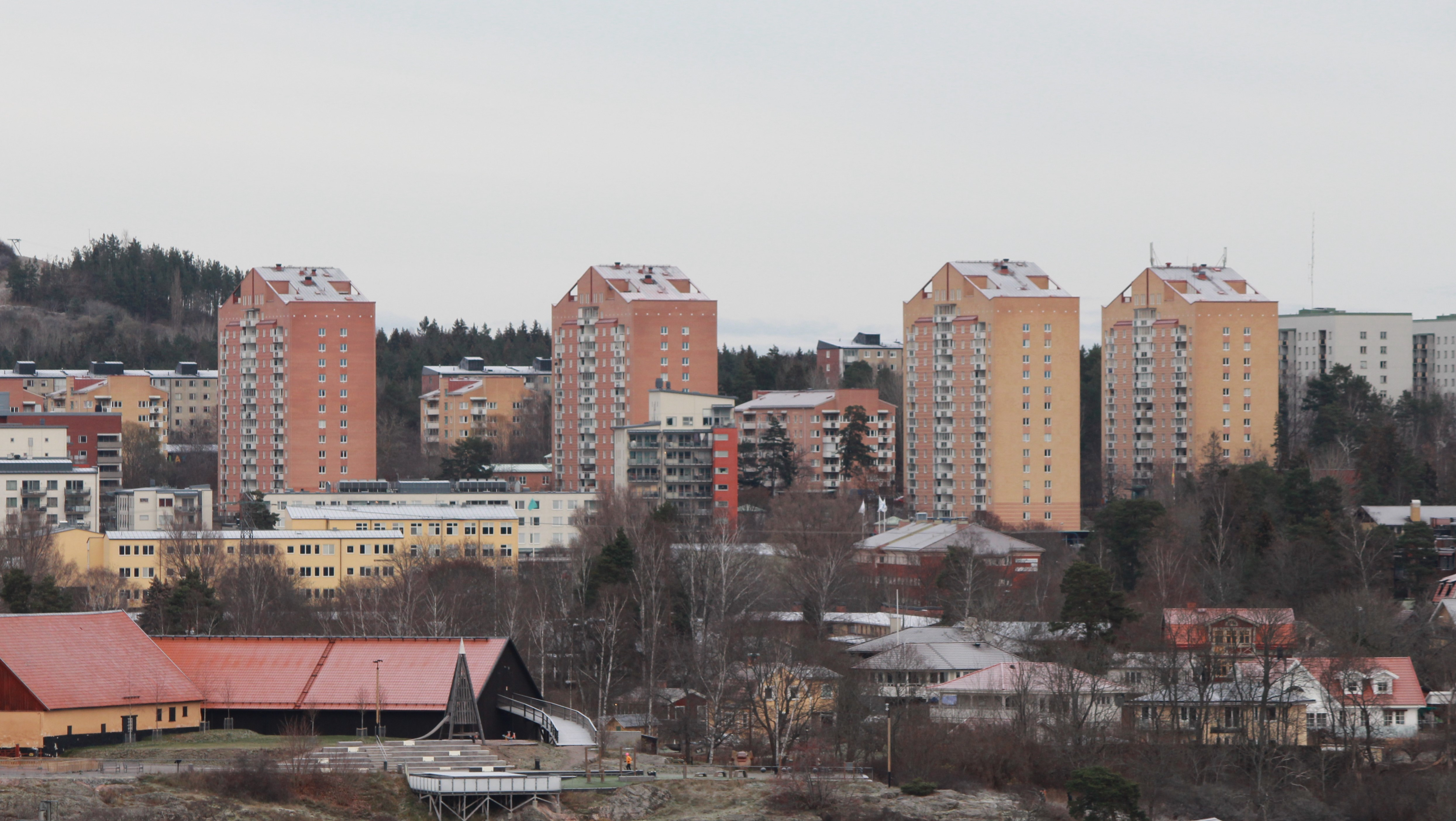
Tall apartment buildings in Edsberg

Edsberg is an urban district in Sollentuna Municipality, Stockholm County, Sweden. It is located at the bottom of the Edsviken Bay, which forms a long inlet all the way from the Baltic Sea. It forms part of Stockholm. In daily use Edsberg means the area with multifamily houses spread around Edsbergs centrum and Edsbergskyrkan north of Danderydsvägen. The municipality part called Edsberg also contains Landsnora, an area of villas to the south of Danderydsvägen and the east of Edsbergsparken. A bit further on to the south of Danderydsvägen is the new area called Kvarnskogen with a mixed set of house types. Also contained in Edsberg is Edsängen between Edsberg and Frestavägen, and the summer house areas a bit further north called Södersättra and Norrsättra. Plans to develop the area to the east of Frestavägen are in the making.

== Edsberg Center ==
The center of Edsberg hosts the community library and numerous stores. The central areas have recently gone through considerable renovations, including a large new parking facility. The Edsberg church is a notable tourist attraction in close proximity to the center. It is a massive red wooden church inaugurated in 1972, with later administrative extensions built in 2003.

== Edsberg Manor ==
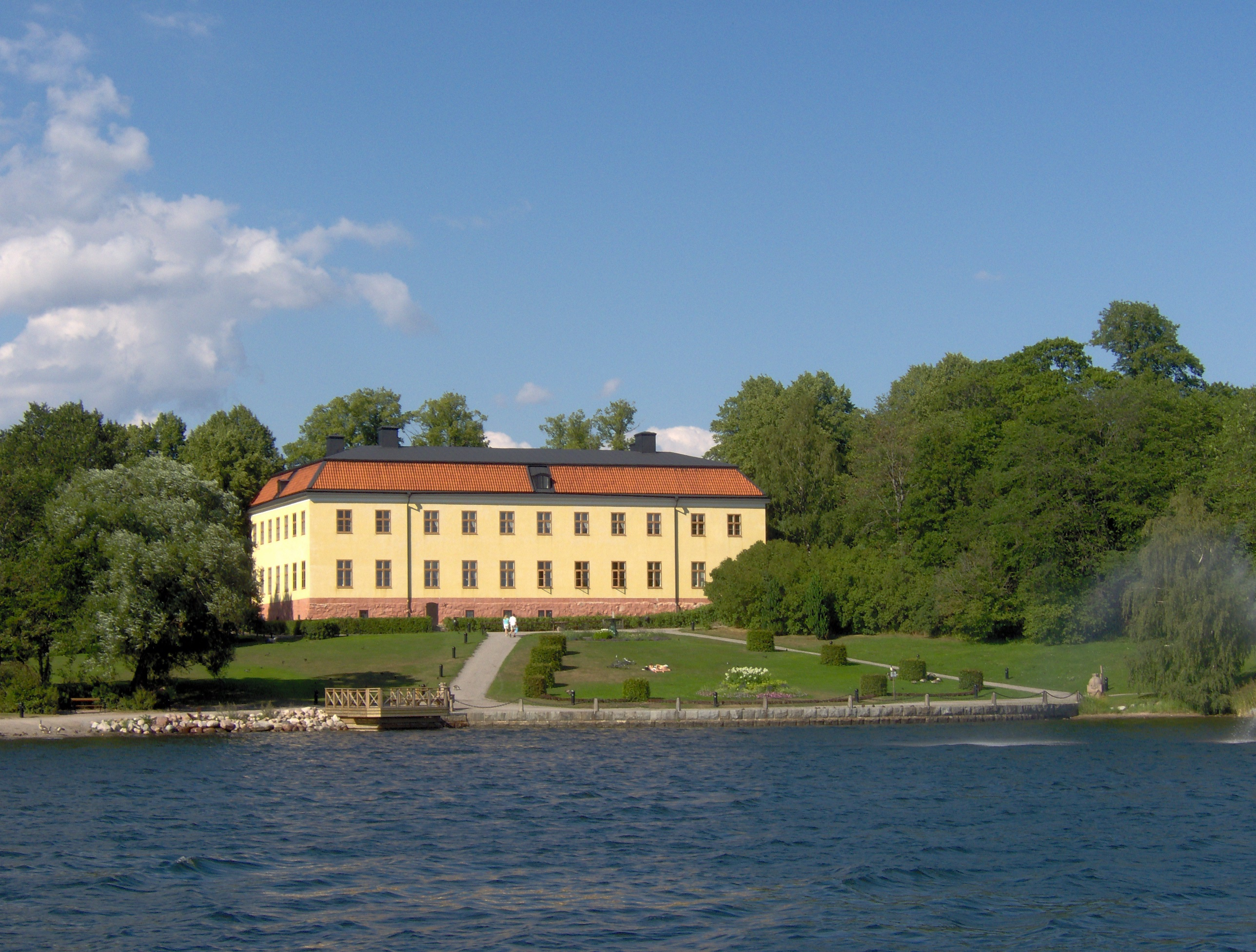
Edsberg Manor

One of the prominent old buildings in the heart of Edsberg is The Edsberg Manor, occupied by The Royal College of Music in Stockholm, and offering tuition in classical music in the form of thematic studies on an internationally high level. This rococo style small castle was built in 1760.

In addition, Edsberg Manor is the home of a chamber orchestra composed of string students.
