= Sollentuna Municipality =

Sollentuna Municipality Sollentuna kommun
- Municipality
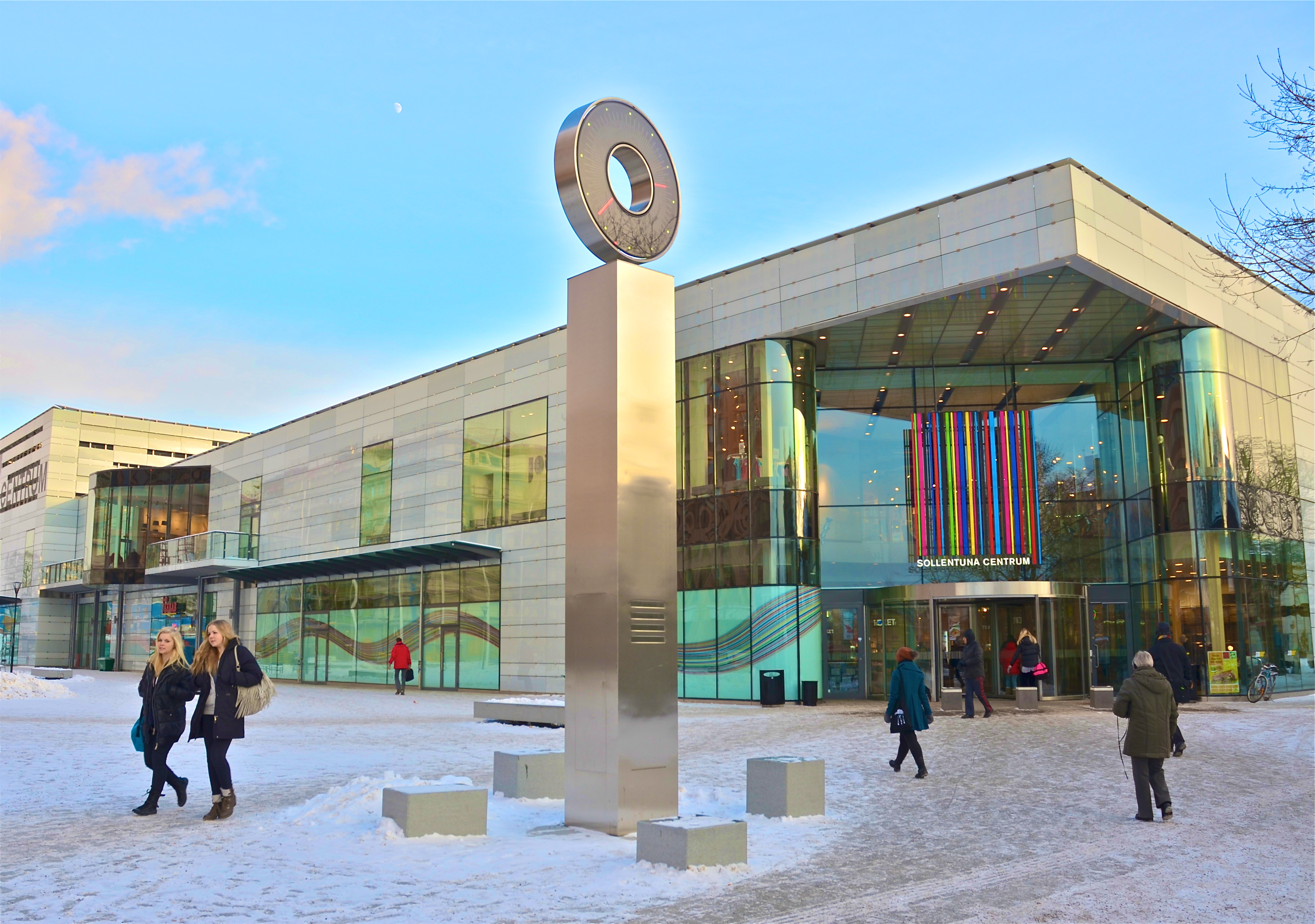

- Flag Coat of arms

- Coordinates: 59°26′N 17°57′E
- Country: Sweden
- County: Stockholm County
- Seat: Tureberg, part of Upplands Väsby

Area
  - Total: 57.98 km^{2} (22.39 sq mi)
  - Land: 52.64 km^{2} (20.32 sq mi)
  - Water: 5.34 km^{2} (2.06 sq mi)
- Area as of 1 January 2014.

Population (30 June 2025)
  - Total: 77,907
  - Density: 1,480/km^{2} (3,833/sq mi)
- Demonyms: Sollentuner; Sollentunan; Sollentunian
- Time zone: UTC+1 (CET)
  - Summer (DST): UTC+2 (CEST)
- ISO 3166 code: SE
- Province: Uppland
- Municipal code: 163
- Website: www.sollentuna.se
- Density is calculated using land area only.

Sollentuna Municipality (Swedish: Sollentuna kommun; [ˈsɔ̂lːɛnˌtʉːna kʊˈmʉːn]) is a municipality in Stockholm County in east-central Sweden, approximately 14 kilometres north of the city centre of Stockholm. Its seat of local government is located in Tureberg, which is a part of Sollentuna urban area.

== Geography ==
Sollentuna borders the municipalities of Solna, Sundbyberg, Stockholm, Järfälla, Upplands Väsby, Täby and Danderyd in clockwise order starting to the south.

=== Localities and districts ===
Since 1995, the bulk of the built-up area of the municipality has been statistically included in the multimunicipal city of Stockholm.

The municipality is subdivided into the following districts according to population as of 31 December 2021:

- Tureberg, 19,127 inhabitants
- Rotebro, 8,824 inhabitants
- Helenelund, 12,678 inhabitants
- Edsberg, 12,338 inhabitants
- Viby, 5,748 inhabitants
- Sjöberg, 4,705 inhabitants
- Häggvik, 5,518 inhabitants
- Norrviken, 3,349 inhabitants
- Vaxmora, 2,635 inhabitants
- Järvafältet, 186 inhabitants
- Total: 75,108

=== Lakes ===
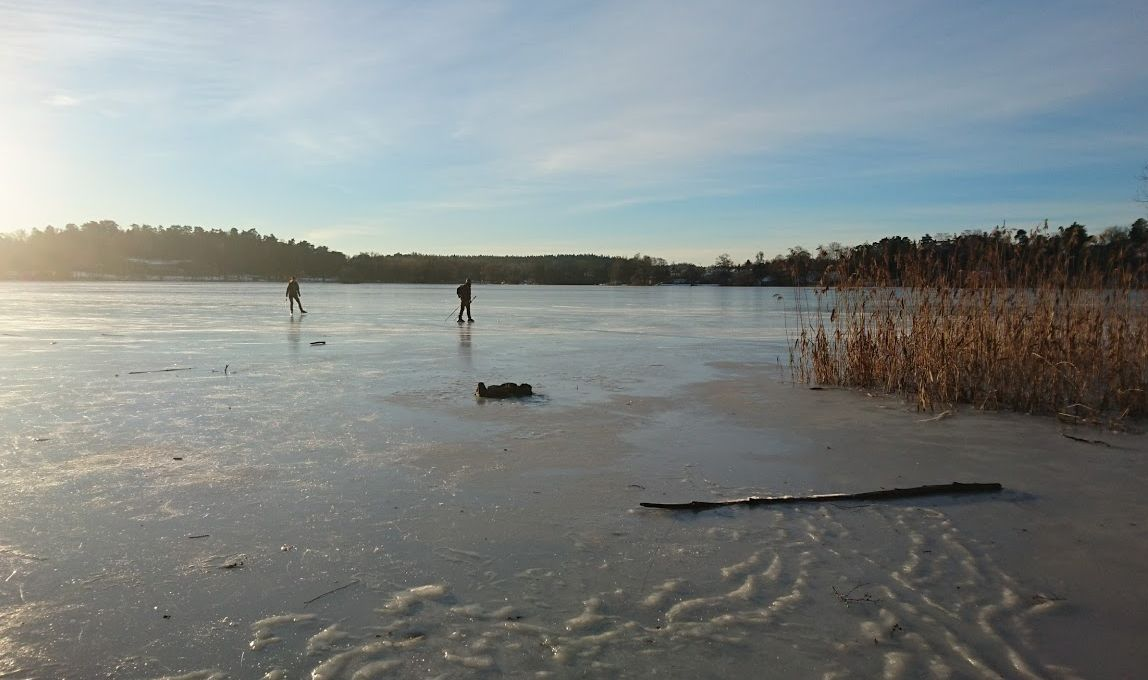
Ice skating on Lake Norrviken in winter.

Central to the landscape of Sollentuna are the rather big lakes Norrviken and Edsviken—the later a bay of the Baltic Sea.

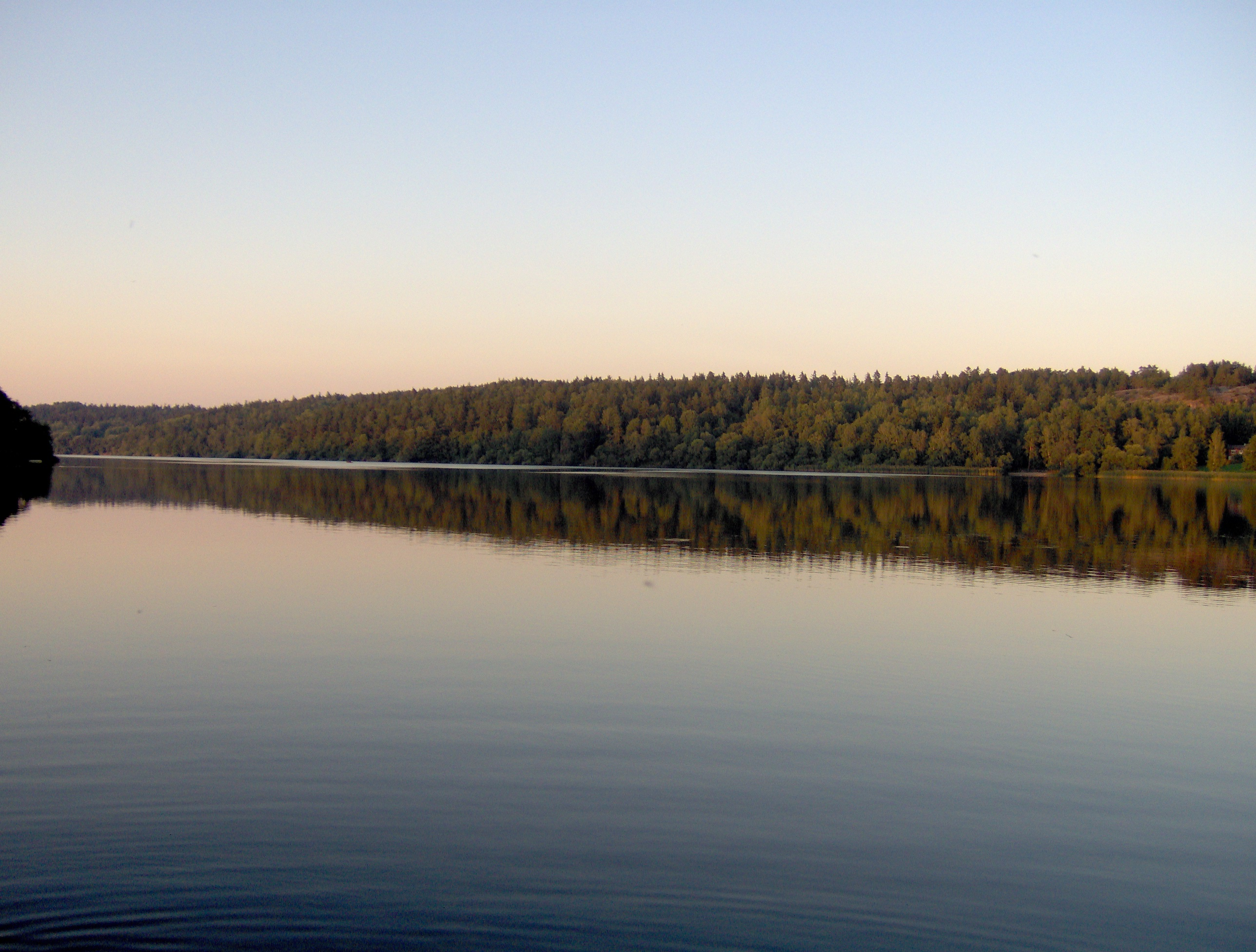
Lake Norrviken

Edsviken and Norrviken are popular lakes for ice tour skating during the winter. The municipality plows a 15 kilometre long skating track on Norrviken. Note that Norrviken is also the name of a district at the western shore of the Norrviken lake.

Other lakes:

- Fjäturen
- Ravalen
- Rösjön
- Väsjön
- Översjön
- Snuggan
- Djupan

== History ==
Sollentuna municipality was founded in conjunction with the reform of local government in Sweden in 1863. However, its boundaries are almost equivalent to those of Sollentuna Parish, which dates back to the 12th century. Well into the 20th century, Sollentuna was a predominantly rural area.

Modern Sollentuna evolved around the railway between Uppsala and Stockholm, inaugurated in 1866. Five of the eight districts that make up the municipality today correspond to railway stations, now operated by Stockholm commuter rail system. From south to north: Helenelund, Tureberg (railway station is Sollentuna railway station), Häggvik, Norrviken and Rotebro. Viby is an extension of Norrviken and the two remaining districts— Edsberg and Sjöberg—are found along the road to Danderyd. Other roads into Sollentuna includes the road from Kallhäll to Rotebro and the E 4 motorway that approximates the same route as the railway.

Sollentuna received the title of a merchant town (köping) in 1944. Köping status was made obsolete by the municipal reform of 1971.

== Demography ==
=== Population development ===
Population development in Sollentuna Municipality 1810–2019
Year	Population
1810	872
1850	827
1900	1,290
1910	2,269
1920	3,933
1930	9,221
1940	13,485
1950	18,631
1960	25,145
1970	37,723
1975	43,413
1980	45,868
1985	48,212
1990	51,377
1995	54,553
2000	58,048
2005	59,355
2010	64,630
2015	70,251
2017	71,848
2019	73,857

=== Income and Education ===
The population in Sollentuna Municipality has the 11th highest median income per capita in Sweden. The share of highly educated persons, according to Statistics Sweden's definition: persons with post-secondary education that is three years or longer, is 40.7% (national average: 27.0%) and the 9th highest in the country.

=== Residents with a foreign background ===
On 31 December 2017, the number of people with a foreign background (persons born outside of Sweden or with two parents born outside of Sweden) was 23 284, or 32.41% of the population (71 848 on 31 December 2017). On 31 December 2002, the number of residents with a foreign background was (per the same definition) 12 443, or 21.26% of the population (58 515 on 31 December 2002). On 31 December 2017, there were 71 848 residents in Sollentuna, of which 17 657 people (24.58%) were born in a country other than Sweden. Divided by country in the table below - the Nordic countries, as well as the 12 most common countries of birth outside of Sweden for Swedish residents have been included, with other countries of birth bundled together by continent by Statistics Sweden.

Country of birth
31 December 2017
1	Sweden	54,191
2	Asia: Other countries	3,378
3	European Union: Other countries	2,393
4	Iran	1,662
5	South America	1,410
6	Finland	1,167
7	Iraq	1,115
8	Syria	1,043
9	Africa: Other countries	950
10	Poland	670
11	Turkey	557
12	Europe outside of the EU: other countries	503
13	North America	472
14	Germany	403
15	Afghanistan	322
16	Somalia	273
17	Thailand	259
18	Norway	237
19	Yugoslavia/Yugoslavia; SFR Yugoslavia/Serbia and Montenegro	178
20	Eritrea	150
21	Bosnia and Herzegovina	145
22	Denmark	138
23	Iceland	79
24	Oceania	71
25	Soviet Union	69
26	Unknown country of birth	13

=== 2022 population by district ===
This is a demographic table based on Sollentuna Municipality's electoral districts in the 2022 Swedish general election sourced from SVT's election platform, in turn taken from SCB official statistics.

There were 74,969 residents and 52,341 Swedish citizens of voting age. 48.3% voted for the left coalition and 50.0% for the right coalition. Indicators are in percentage points except population totals and income.

Location	Residents	Citizen adults	Left vote	Right vote	Employed	Swedish parents	Foreign heritage	Income SEK	Degree
Location			%	%					
10 Mellersta Rotebro	1,702	1,225	51.3	48.2	83	78	22	32,086	61
11 Gillbo-Gillberga	1,809	1,325	44.3	54.3	87	84	16	37,700	59
12 Södra Rotebro	1,549	1,021	56.6	39.4	69	45	55	22,814	37
13 Rotsunda	944	631	49.3	47.4	69	48	52	22,942	38
14 Rotsunda gård	1,472	980	42.5	55.2	73	47	53	26,336	38
15 Rotsunda strand	1,388	984	50.2	48.7	76	62	38	26,301	48
21 Södra Viby	1,802	1,292	44.1	54.8	85	83	17	41,363	69
22 Norra Viby	2,071	1,405	49.2	50.1	87	79	21	38,508	64
23 Östra Viby	1,620	1,168	48.2	50.4	85	78	22	36,081	65
31 Norra Norrviken	1,951	1,390	51.0	48.3	82	77	23	33,145	64
32 Södra Norrviken	1,765	1,335	48.6	50.6	84	79	21	34,241	65
41 Väsjön	1,853	1,166	46.7	52.1	82	57	43	38,166	66
42 Edsängen-Solängen	1,847	1,293	45.8	53.3	84	81	19	39,142	68
43 Tunberget	1,463	979	47.0	51.9	81	68	32	33,936	65
51 Östra Häggvik	1,427	1,113	48.3	50.3	84	70	30	30,045	59
52 Västra Häggvik	1,920	1,421	51.2	47.1	80	62	38	26,662	51
53 Skälby-Edsbacka	1,667	1,241	51.7	47.6	85	80	20	38,839	70
54 Nytorp	1,542	1,161	39.5	59.3	84	72	28	39,380	74
55 S Häggvik-Edstorp	1,204	1,062	49.7	49.1	82	77	23	31,911	65
61 Edsbergs C	1,742	1,141	53.2	43.3	74	45	55	25,513	52
62 Västra Edsberg	1,900	1,225	57.9	38.7	70	43	57	22,097	44
63 Östra Edsberg	1,676	1,063	59.8	36.3	71	41	59	21,272	37
64 Norra Landsnora	1,550	1,060	54.3	43.4	76	59	41	25,980	50
65 Edsbacka-Edsängen	1,274	938	51.2	46.4	77	54	46	26,212	48
70 Södra Töjnan	2,069	1,449	46.6	51.7	83	61	39	33,670	65
71 Norra Töjnan	1,926	1,342	45.0	53.8	82	69	31	36,360	62
72 Knista	1,877	1,185	51.7	46.7	81	49	51	31,916	64
73 Östra Bagarby	1,354	901	64.9	29.2	59	17	83	14,886	41
74 Västra Bagarby	1,878	1,164	66.6	29.1	67	27	73	20,805	42
75 Fågelsången	1,605	1,124	48.7	50.6	85	76	24	38,746	73
76 Turebergs villastad	2,092	1,438	40.4	59.4	86	82	18	45,384	76
77 Sollentuna C	1,578	1,332	50.4	48.4	80	60	40	30,022	62
78 Norra Bagarby	1,884	1,365	57.8	39.6	76	51	49	27,342	55
79 Mellersta Bagarby	1,527	975	64.8	25.4	59	14	86	15,627	32
80 Södra Landsnora	1,680	1,172	36.1	62.7	86	77	23	43,028	75
81 Västra Sjöberg	1,402	1,096	40.6	59.0	79	73	27	34,734	66
82 Östra Sjöberg	1,497	1,075	40.1	58.5	84	70	30	32,212	61
83 Kärrdal	1,488	1,098	48.1	50.7	85	71	29	30,869	56
90 Södra Edsviken	1,950	1,408	42.1	57.3	82	84	16	40,750	75
91 Eriksberg	1,814	1,223	44.2	53.9	81	61	39	35,390	61
92 Helenelunds C	2,038	1,244	56.0	41.7	75	38	62	26,035	59
93 Tegelhagen	1,794	1,224	46.3	53.0	89	76	24	41,608	76
94 Norra Edsviken	1,947	1,453	36.1	62.9	83	82	18	45,139	77
95 Silverdal	2,431	1,454	41.0	58.1	92	75	25	49,711	78
Source: SVT

== Politics and government ==
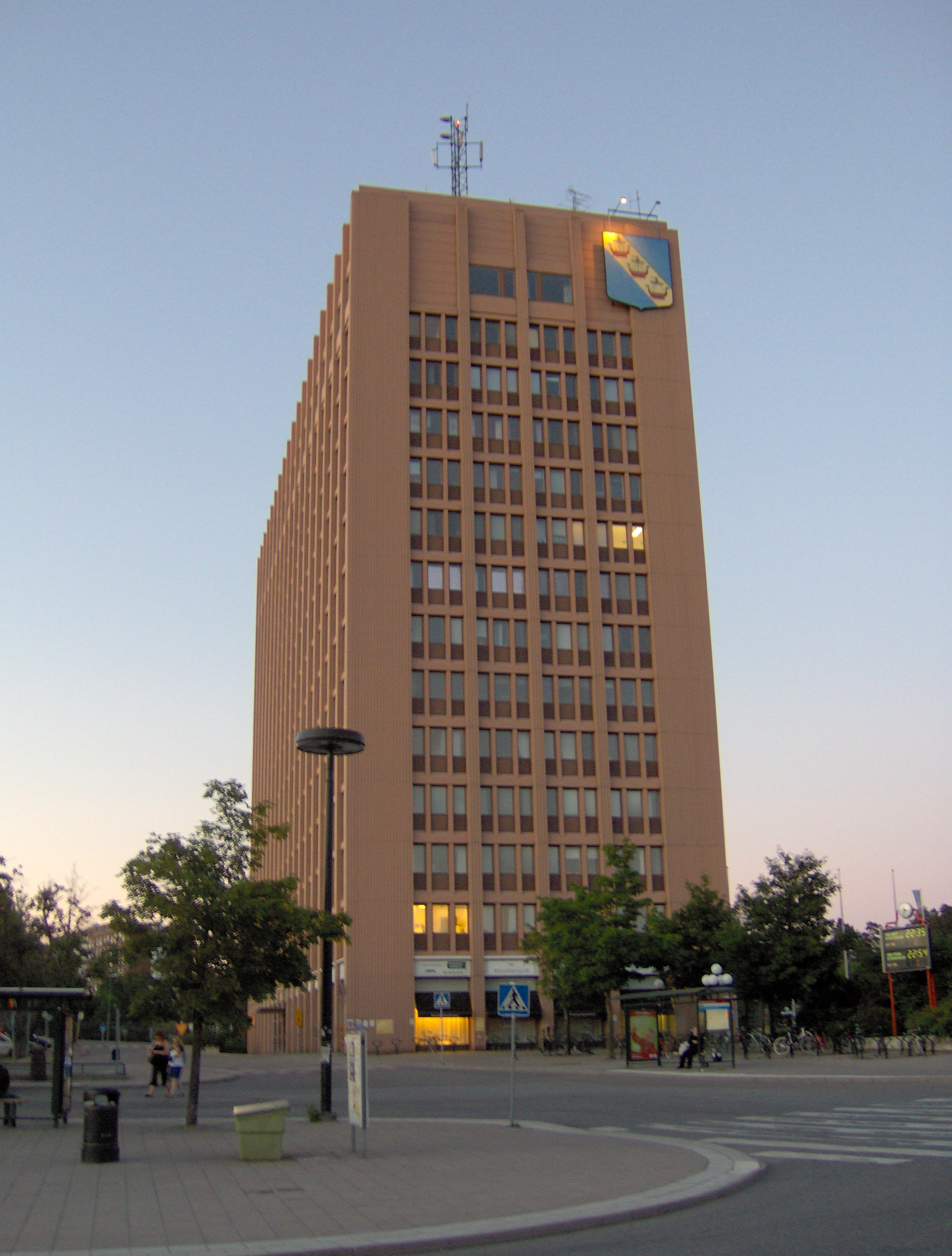
Turebergshuset, municipal building

Sollentuna Municipality has a municipal assembly with 61 members elected by proportional representation through municipal elections, held in conjunction with the national parliamentary elections every four years. The assembly elects a municipal board, (kommunstyrelse) which is the municipality's main governing body, chaired by the Mayor (sw. kommunstyrelsens ordförande). The current mayor is Henrik Thunes, of the Moderate Party.

=== 2022 election results ===
In the 2022 municipal elections, the council's seat composition was the following:

The governing parties
- The Moderate Party 19
- The Liberals 5
- The Centre Party 5
- The Christian Democrats 3
Parties in opposition
- The Swedish Social Democratic Party 17
- The Sweden Democrats 5
- The Left Party 4
- The Green Party 3

=== 2018 election results ===
In the 2018 municipal elections, the council's seat composition was the following:

The governing parties
- The Moderate Party 19
- The Liberal People's Party 6
- The Christian Democrats 5
- The Centre Party 4
Parties in opposition
- The Swedish Social Democratic Party 13
- The Sweden Democrats 5
- The Left Party 4
- The Green Party 3
- The Sollentuna Party 2

=== 2014 election results ===
In the 2014 municipal elections, the council's seat composition was the following:

The governing parties
- The Moderate Party 22
- The Liberal People's Party 6
- The Christian Democrats 4
Parties in opposition
- The Swedish Social Democratic Party 12
- The Left Party 2
- The Sollentuna Party 4
- The Green Party 5
- The Sweden Democrats 3
- The Centre Party 3

=== 2010 election results ===
In the 2010 municipal elections, the council's seat composition was the following:

The governing parties
- The Moderate Party 26
- The Liberal People's Party 7
- The Centre Party 2
- The Christian Democrats 2
Parties in opposition
- The Swedish Social Democratic Party 11
- The Left Party 2
- The Sollentuna Party 6
- The Green Party 4
- The Sweden Democrats 1

=== 2006 election results ===
In the 2006 municipal elections, the council's seat composition was the following:

The governing parties
- The Moderate Party 26
- The Liberal People's Party 7
- The Centre Party 2
- The Christian Democrats 4
Parties in opposition
- The Swedish Social Democratic Party 13
- The Left Party 2
- The Sollentuna Party 5
- The Green Party 2

=== 2002 election results ===
In the 2002 municipal elections, the council's seat composition was the following:

The governing parties
- The Moderate Party 19
- The Liberal People's Party 11
- The Centre Party 2
- The Christian Democrats 4
Parties in opposition
- The Swedish Social Democratic Party 16
- The Left Party 3
- The Sollentuna Party 4
- The Green Party 2

=== List of mayors since 1971 ===
- (1971–1974) Urban Gibson (fp)
- (1974–1977) Carl-Erik Nilsson (c)
- (1977–1980) Sven Olle Isidor Persson (s)
- (1980–1987) Jan-Olov Sundström (m)
- (1987–1998) Gun Blomberg (m)
- (1998–2000) Christina Naess (m)
- (2000–2010) Torbjörn Rosdahl (m)
- (2010-2015-07-11) Douglas Lithborn (m)
- (2015-07-12- 2015-09-16) Anna Lena Johansson (fp)
- 2015-09-17- Henrik Thunes (m)

== Public transport ==
Sollentuna is served by the Stockholm public transport system. Stockholm commuter rail has five stations within the municipality. There is also an extensive SL bus network serving the area. The wide majority of bus lines are 500s or 600s bus lines i.e. start with the digit 5 or 6 and are thus part of the northern and western SL districts.

== Sights ==
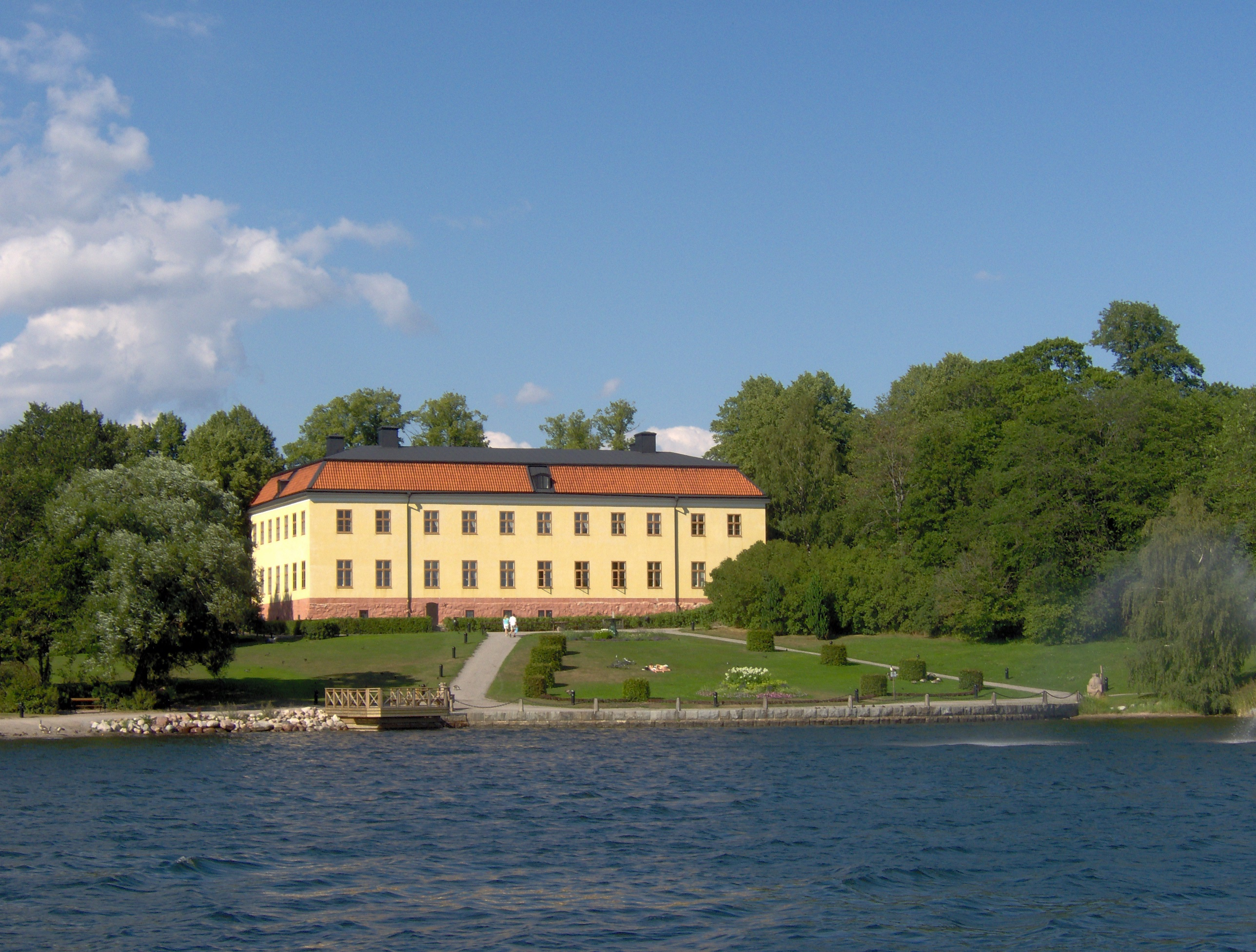
Edsbergs slott

- Edsbacka krog, located by Edsbacka lake and founded already in 1634, was the only Swedish restaurant with two stars in the Michelin Guide until it closed in February 2010. Now the site has a slightly less fancy restaurant, again under the name, Edsbacka Krog
- Edsbergs slott was built in the rococo style in 1760. It's 400 m^{2}
- Probable burial mound of King Agne from the 5th century.

== Sports ==
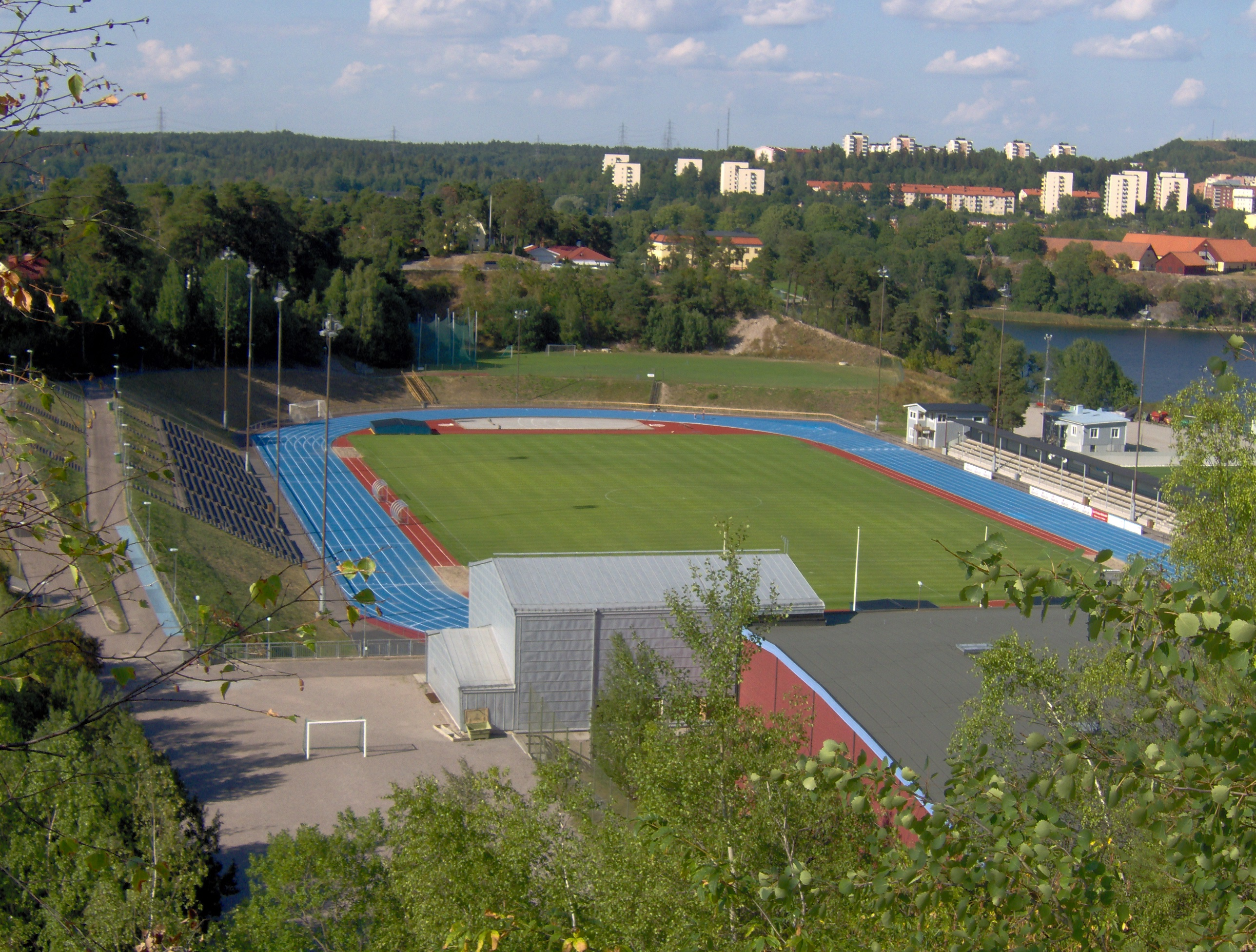
Sollentunavallen

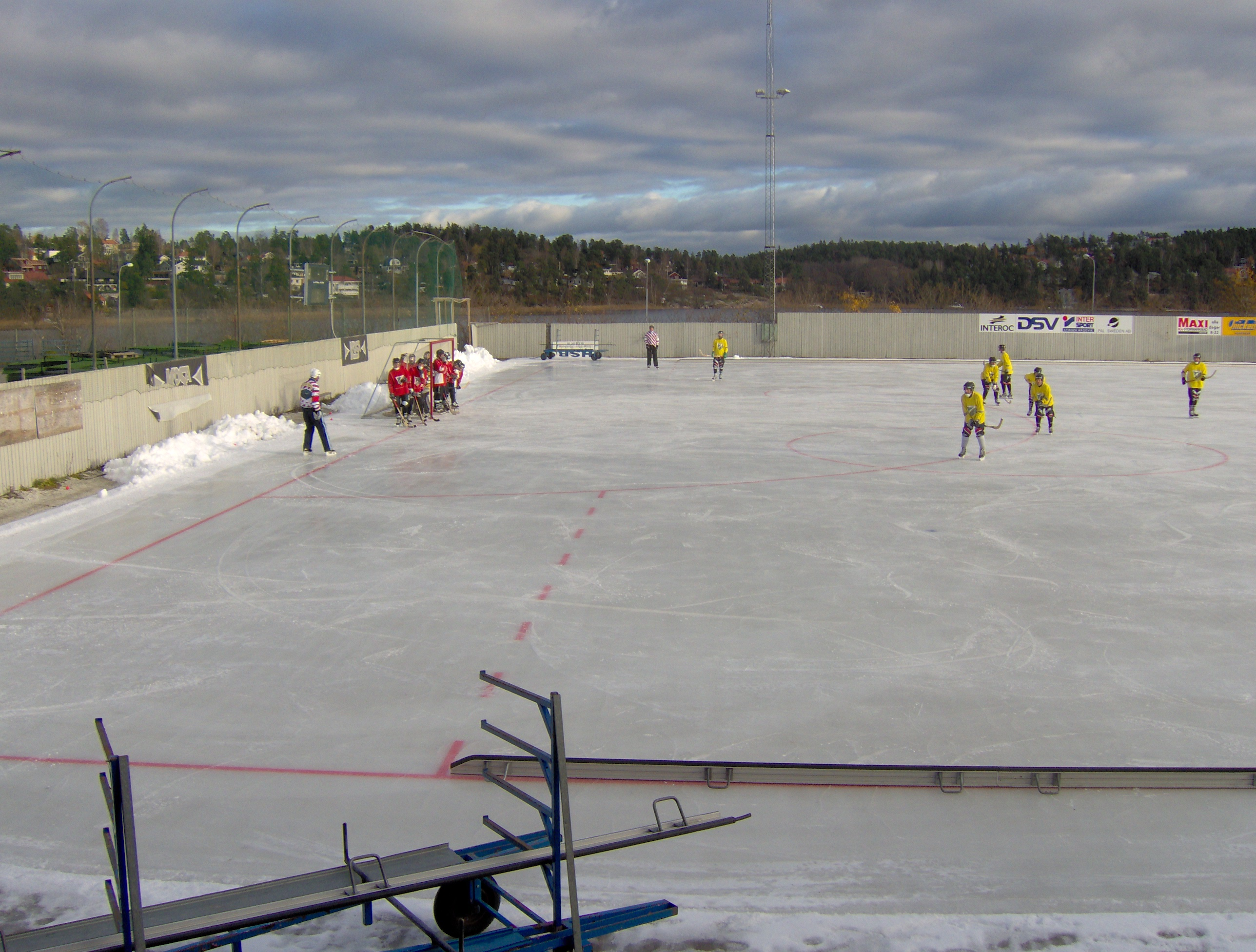
Bandy at Sollentunavallen

Sollentunavallen is the biggest playing field. It consists of two fields. The main arena is for football and athletics. Alongside it, there's a field with artificial grass, which is used for bandy during the winter season.

The following sports clubs are located in Sollentuna Municipality:

- Sollentuna Kanotsällskap
- Sollentuna Skridskosällskap
- Sollentuna Volleybollklubb
- Rotebro IS FF
- Sollentuna FK
- Konståkningsklubben Sollentuna
- Turebergs FK
- Helenelunds IK
- Sollentuna HC
- SKIFT

As of December 2022 there are 64 sports clubs in Sollentuna. The full list is maintained on the municipality web site.

== Notable people ==
- Jonas Bane, actor
- Kajsa Bergqvist, high jump world champion
- Thomas Bodström, football player, politician, former minister of justice
- Ted Gärdestad, pop musician
- Maia Hirasawa, musician
- Patric Hörnqvist, ice hockey player currently with the Florida Panthers of the NHL
- Jonatan Johansson, snowboarder
- Ulrika Jonsson, television presenter
- Charlotte Lindström, former model who was charged in 2007 for ordering a hitman to kill two witnesses in Australia
- Johan Munck, Chief Justice of Sweden
- Christer Pettersson, Olof Palme murder suspect
- Rickard Rakell, ice hockey player currently with the Pittsburgh Penguins of the NHL
- Emilia Andersson Ramboldt, ice hockey player and former captain of the Swedish women's national team
- Rednex, country pop group
- Lovisa Selander, ice hockey goaltender for the Boston Pride and the Swedish women's national team
- Farhad Shakely, poet
- Linda Skugge, writer
- Mats Sundin, professional ice hockey player
- Niklas Svedberg, professional ice hockey goaltender
- Rolf Tibblin, two-time Motocross World Champion (1962, 1963)
- Caroline Winberg, model
- Mia Mulder, video essayist, activist, podcaster, city councillor
- Clara Petersson Bergsten, handball player

== Twin towns – sister cities ==
The municipality is twinned with:

- Hvidovre in Denmark
- Saue in Estonia
- Tuusula in Finland
- Oppegård in Norway

== See also ==
- Sollentuna Hundred
