= Scott M. Grundy =

American Cardiologist (1933–2025)

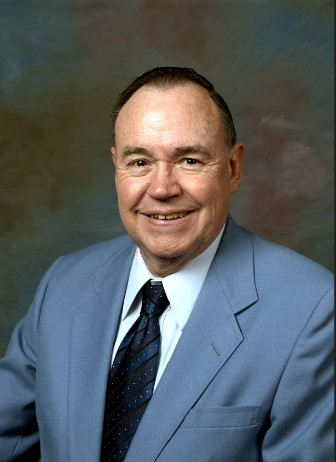
- Scott M. Grundy
- Born: Scott Montgomery Grundy; July 10, 1933; Memphis, Texas
- Died: January 29, 2025 (aged 91)
- Education: Texas Tech University (BS); Baylor College of Medicine (MS) (MD); Rockefeller University (PhD)
- Scientific career
- Fields: Cardiology, Human nutrition, Lipidology
- Workplaces: University of Texas Southwestern Medical Center

Scott M. Grundy (10 July 1933 – 29 January 2025) was an American physician and researcher in cardiovascular medicine and nutrition science. He conducted research on cholesterol metabolism and was involved in the development of national and international guidelines for the prevention of atherosclerotic cardiovascular disease (ASCVD). Grundy's work explored the role of low-density lipoprotein (LDL) cholesterol, also known as “bad” cholesterol, in heart disease and the clinical use of statins.

== Early life and education ==
Scott Montgomery Grundy was born July 10, 1933, in Memphis, Texas, to Beulah and Allen Grundy. After Allen's passing, Beulah raised Scott along with his siblings, Larry, and Elizabeth. In his early years, Dr. Grundy played basketball and baseball, receiving a college athletic scholarship. After completing his undergraduate education, he married Lois Parker (1936–2024), a special education professional. Together, they had two children; Stephan (1967–2021) and Pamela (1962–).

He earned a Bachelor of Science from Texas Technological College, now Texas Tech University, in 1955, followed by a combined Master of Science and medical degree with honors from Baylor College of Medicine in 1960. He completed a Ph.D. at Rockefeller University in 1968, focusing on lipid metabolism.

== Career ==
Dr. Scott Grundy held leadership roles at several major government-funded and academic institutions. From 1971 to 1973, he directed the Metabolic Division at the National Institute of Diabetes and Digestive and Kidney Diseases (NIDDK) in Phoenix, Arizona. He then led the Metabolic Disease Laboratory at the Veterans Administration Hospital affiliated with the University of California, San Diego until 1981. He later became the Founding Director of the Center for Human Nutrition (1981–2013) at the University of Texas Southwestern Medical Center (UTSW), where he also chaired the Department of Clinical Nutrition and served as a professor of Biochemistry and Internal Medicine (1981–2015). He also directed the Metabolic Unit and Endocrine Clinic at the Dallas Veterans Affairs Medical Center.

Grundy served on numerous committees of the American Heart Association (AHA), including the Council on Arteriosclerosis, Thrombosis and Vascular Biology (ATVB), Nutrition Committee, Task Force on Risk Reduction, and Task Force on Cholesterol. He was one of the original founding members of the AHA's Nutrition, Physical Activity and Metabolism (NPAM) Council, now the Council on Lifestyle and Cardiometabolic Health. He was a Fellow of the National Lipid Association (FNLA) and certified by the American Board of Clinical Lipidologists (ABCL). He was also a member of the International Atherosclerosis Society (IAS), the National Academy of Medicine, and the Texas Academy of Medicine, Engineering, Science, and Technology (TAMEST).

== Public health policy ==
Grundy contributed to the development of public nutrition policies and clinical guidelines for cholesterol management. In 1985, he was involved in the formation of the National Cholesterol Education Program (NCEP) under the National Heart, Lung, and Blood Institute (NHLBI). He chaired the Adult Treatment Panels (ATP II and III) of the NCEP, which issued evidence-based recommendations for managing high LDL cholesterol levels. In 2005, Grundy and his colleagues contributed to the establishment of diagnostic criteria and treatment strategies for metabolic syndrome at the NHLBI/AHA conference. He also co-chaired the 2018 multi-society Guideline on the Management of Blood Cholesterol, issued by a joint task force of the American College of Cardiology and the AHA.

== Research ==
Grundy published research on topics related nutrition, cardiovascular health, and cholesterol metabolism, including studies with Michael Stuart Brown and Joseph L. Goldstein.

His work contributed to the lipid hypothesis, positing that elevated LDL cholesterol is a primary cause of atherosclerosis. This hypothesis has been examined through decades of epidemiological research and randomized controlled trials, particularly those involving statin therapy.

Grundy conducted clinical research in three primary areas: (a) cholesterol, triglycerides, and lipoprotein metabolism; (b) the impact of dietary fats on lipid metabolism; and (c) obesity and metabolic syndrome.

- Gallstones: His research identified metabolic abnormalities that lead to cholesterol gallstones, particularly in obese individuals. His research showed how cholesterol crystals form in bile before stones develop.
- Hypertriglyceridemia: He investigated the mechanisms behind hypertriglyceridemia or elevated triglycerides in conditions such as diabetes and nephrotic syndrome, linking them to changes in LDL metabolism.
- Lipid Metabolism: He developed methods to study cholesterol synthesis, absorption, and bile acid metabolism, informing the understanding of liver function, lipid transport, and hypercholesterolemia (i.e. high cholesterol levels).
- Metabolic Syndrome: He studied how conditions like obesity, high blood sugar, and high blood pressure often occur together—a combination now known as metabolic syndrome. This research showed how this syndrome increases the risk of heart disease, informing guidelines for diagnosing and treating it.
- Statins and Other Cholesterol Medications: His work explored statins in clinical settings, demonstrating their effectiveness in lowering LDL cholesterol and reducing cardiovascular risk. Grundy's research also explored other cholesterol-influencing medications, such as fibrates and ezetimibe.

== Honors and awards ==
- Pioneer in Prevention Award from the American Society for Preventive Cardiology (2022)
- W. Virgil Brown Distinguished Achievement Award from the National Lipid Association (2010)
- AHA Gold Heart Award (2009)
- AHA Distinguished Scientist (2005)
- AHA Discovery Award (2000)
- American Society for Nutrition (ASN) E.V. McCollum Award (1998)
- Bristol-Myers Squibb/Mead Johnson Award for Distinguished Achievement in Nutrition Research (1997)
- National Academy of Medicine membership (1995)
- Honorary Degree in Medicine from the University of Helsinki (1990)
- Award of Merit from the AHA (1983)

UTSW has named several professorships for him: Scott Grundy Director's Chair and Dr. Scott M. Grundy Distinguished Professorship in Human Nutrition. The institution hosts an annual Scott Grundy Symposium.

The American Heart Association annually awards the Scott Grundy Fellowship Award for Excellence in Metabolism Research to recognize abstracts on diabetes, lipids and lipoproteins, or obesity and adipose tissue distribution.
