= Gilman Hall =

- Room 307, Gilman Hall, University of California, Berkeley
- U.S. National Register of Historic Places
- U.S. National Historic Landmark
- Berkeley Landmark
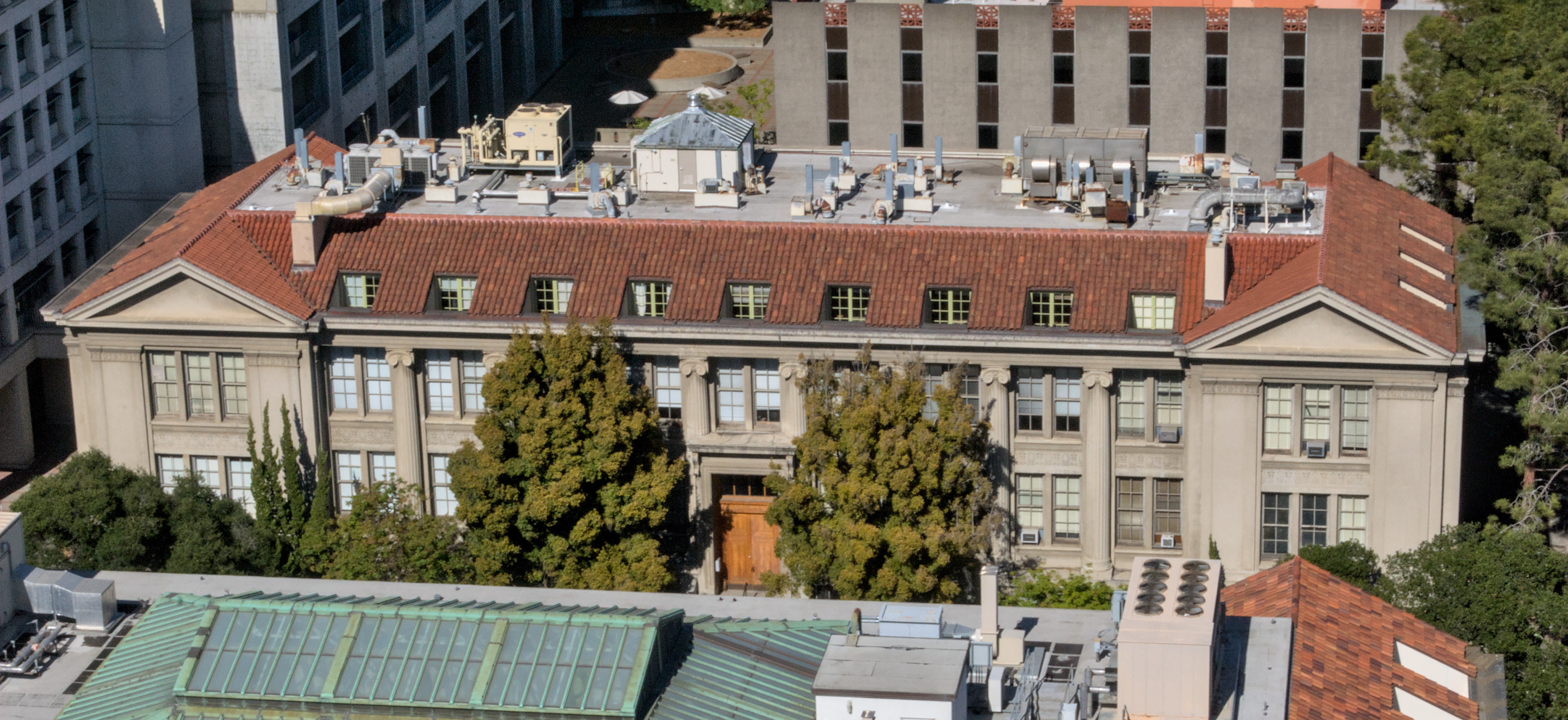
- Gilman Hall in 2022

- Location within California
- Location: University of California at Berkeley campus, Berkeley, California
- Coordinates: 37°52′21.42″N 122°15′22.55″W
- Built: 1916-1917
- Architect: John Galen Howard
- NRHP reference No.: 66000203
- BERKL No.: 151

Significant dates
- Added to NRHP: October 15, 1966
- Designated NHL: December 21, 1965
- Designated BERKL: February 25, 1991

Gilman Hall is a building on the campus of the University of California, Berkeley. Room 307 was where Glenn T. Seaborg and his coworkers identified plutonium as a new element on February 23, 1941 and as such, is designated a National Historic Landmark. The building itself is designated a National Historic Chemical Landmark, recognizing the two Nobel Prizes in Chemistry that have resulted from research done in the building.

== History ==
Gilman Hall was built from 1916 to 1917 to accommodate an expanded College of Chemistry under the leadership of Gilbert N. Lewis. Designed by John Galen Howard, the building provided research and teaching facilities for faculty and students specializing in physical, inorganic and nuclear chemistry. It was named for Daniel Coit Gilman, president of the University of California from 1872 to 1875.

== Room 307 ==
In 1942, the Berkeley campus became quite involved in the war effort of World War II. The top floor, or "attic," of Gilman Hall was fenced off for classified work in nuclear chemistry. Half of the rooms in the attic had small balconies that could be used as outdoor fume hoods, but the actual hoods in Gilman Hall were not equipped with fans. They operated only as chimneys, with a burner flame that produced a draft. For the war work, electrically powered fans were finally installed to vent the hoods. Plutonium research in Gilman Hall was part of the Manhattan Project to develop the atomic bomb. The plutonium work was followed at Gilman Hall by the preparation of uranium-233, a new fissionable isotope of uranium, by Seaborg, J. W. Gofman and R. W. Stoughton. In 1942, Seaborg left Berkeley to join the Manhattan Project in Chicago. He returned to Berkeley after the war and directed the university's nuclear chemistry research.

Between 1976 and 1983, as part of the Formerly Utilized Sites Remedial Action Program, the Department of Energy conducted remedial action to remove or shield floor and walls contaminated with uranium from the nuclear research done in the Hall.

== Nobel Prizes ==
Two Nobel Prizes in Chemistry have been awarded for research done in the building. The first was to William Giauque in 1949 for his studies in the properties of matter at temperatures close to absolute zero. Seaborg received the second one in 1951 for discoveries in the transuranium elements.

Four other individuals who did research here received Nobel Prizes for later work as well.

== Gilman Hall today ==
Gilman Hall has been used continuously by the College of Chemistry for 80 years; today it is occupied by the Department of Chemical and Biomolecular Engineering. However, its laboratory equipment is no longer suitable for modern chemical research and as such, the University has renovated and converted some of the rooms into offices, classrooms, and small research laboratories.

Following the FUSRAP remediation work, Gillman Hall has been certified as safe to current radiologic standards. The University of California is responsible for maintenance and monitoring of the shielded contamination.
