= Robert Ostfeld =

American cardiologist

- Education: Yale University School of Medicine (MD); Harvard School of Public Health (MS)
- Occupation: Cardiologist

Robert J. Ostfeld is an American cardiologist and advocate of plant-based nutrition.

== Career ==
Ostfield obtained his MD from Yale School of Medicine and a Masters of Science in Epidemiology from Harvard School of Public Health. He completed his medical internship at Massachusetts General Hospital. Ostfeld is the director of the Cardiac Wellness Program at Montefiore and Professor of Medicine at Albert Einstein College of Medicine. He specializes in cardiovascular disease prevention.

Ostfeld is the committee co-chair of the American Society for Preventive Cardiology's Nutrition Working Group. He co-authored the ASPC's 2022 Clinical Practice Statement on Nutrition and Cardiovascular Disease Prevention. Ostfeld advocates a whole-food plant-based diet to prevent cardiovascular disease and has lectured for the Physicians Committee for Responsible Medicine. He is a council member of True Health Initiative.

== Personal life ==
Ostfield is a vegan in his personal life and has maintained a plant-based diet since 2010.

== Selected publications ==
- "Angina rapidly improved with a plant-based diet and returned after resuming a Western diet". Journal of Geriatric Cardiology. 13 (4): 364–366. 2016. doi:10.11909/j.issn.1671-5411.2016.04.005 (inactive 1 July 2025). PMID 27403146.
- Ostfeld, R. J.; Allen, K. E. (2021). "Ultra-Processed Foods and Cardiovascular Disease: Where Do We Go From Here?". Journal of the American College of Cardiology. 77 (12): 1532–1534. doi:10.1016/j.jacc.2021.02.003. PMID 33766259.
- Belardo, Danielle; Michos, Erin D.; Blankstein, Ron; Blumenthal, Roger S.; Ferdinand, Keith C.; Hall, Kevin; Klatt, Kevin; Natajaran, Pradeep; Ostfeld, Robert J.; Reddy, Koushik; Rodriguez, Renee; Sriram, Urshila; Tobias, Deirdre K.; Gulati, Martha (2022). "Practical, Evidence-Based Approaches to Nutritional Modifications to Reduce Atherosclerotic Cardiovascular Disease: An American Society For Preventive Cardiology Clinical Practice Statement". Am J Prev Cardiol. 10 100323. doi:10.1016/j.ajpc.2022.100323. PMID 35284849.
