= Danielle Belardo =

American cardiologist

- Born: October 22, 1985; New York
- Education: University of Delaware; Drexel University College of Medicine (MD, 2014)
- Occupation: Cardiologist

Danielle Belardo (born October 22, 1985) is an American cardiologist and advocate of plant-based nutrition who specializes in cardiovascular disease prevention. She was the lead author of the American Society for Preventive Cardiology 2022 Clinical Practice Statement on Nutrition and Cardiovascular Disease Prevention.

== Career ==
Belardo was born in New York. She obtained an MD from Drexel University College of Medicine in 2014. She completed her internal medicine residency at Temple University Hospital and became board certified in 2017. She completed a Cardiovascular Disease Fellowship at Lankenau Heart Institute in 2020. Belardo was director of cardiology at the Institute of Plant-Based Medicine.

She is currently a cardiologist and founder of Precision Preventive Cardiology, based in Los Angeles. She advocates a whole-food plant-based diet to prevent cardiovascular disease.

Belardo is committee co-chair of the American Society for Preventive Cardiology's Nutrition Working Group and was lead author of their 2022 Clinical Practice Statement on Nutrition and Cardiovascular Disease Prevention. Belardo is a member of the American College of Cardiology. She was a speaker at the World Heart Federation's World Heart Summit in 2023.

== Evidence-based medicine ==
Belardo is known for her support for evidence-based medicine. She has criticized Joe Rogan for platforming antivaxxers and cholesterol denialists.

Belardo has received attacks from some within the vegan community for defending the scientific dietary guidelines on heart health. She has commented that "eating a plant-based diet is a healthful dietary pattern I recommend, but the scientific evidence at this time has not demonstrated that a 100% plant-based diet is superior to a Mediterranean style plant predominant diet with some animal products".

== Personal life ==
Belardo is a vegan for ethical reasons. In 2021 she commented that "going vegan is not a diet, it's a lifestyle about reducing harm to animals in all ways practical and possible. I believe in not eating animal products, I don't wear leather, or buy cosmetics that have been tested on animals". She has stated that most supplements are not necessary unless there is a deficiency and that only a few are beneficial. She takes folic acid, vitamin B12, and vitamin D supplements.

== Selected publications ==
- Belardo, Danielle; Michos, Erin D.; Blankstein, Ron; Blumenthal, Roger S.; Ferdinand, Keith C.; Hall, Kevin; Klatt, Kevin; Natajaran, Pradeep; Ostfeld, Robert J.; Reddy, Koushik; Rodriguez, Renee; Sriram, Urshila; Tobias, Deirdre K.; Gulati, Martha (2022). "Practical, Evidence-Based Approaches to Nutritional Modifications to Reduce Atherosclerotic Cardiovascular Disease: An American Society For Preventive Cardiology Clinical Practice Statement". The American Journal of Preventive Cardiology. 10 100323. doi:10.1016/j.ajpc.2022.100323. PMC 8914096. PMID 35284849.
