= John Gofman =

American scientist

John W. Gofman
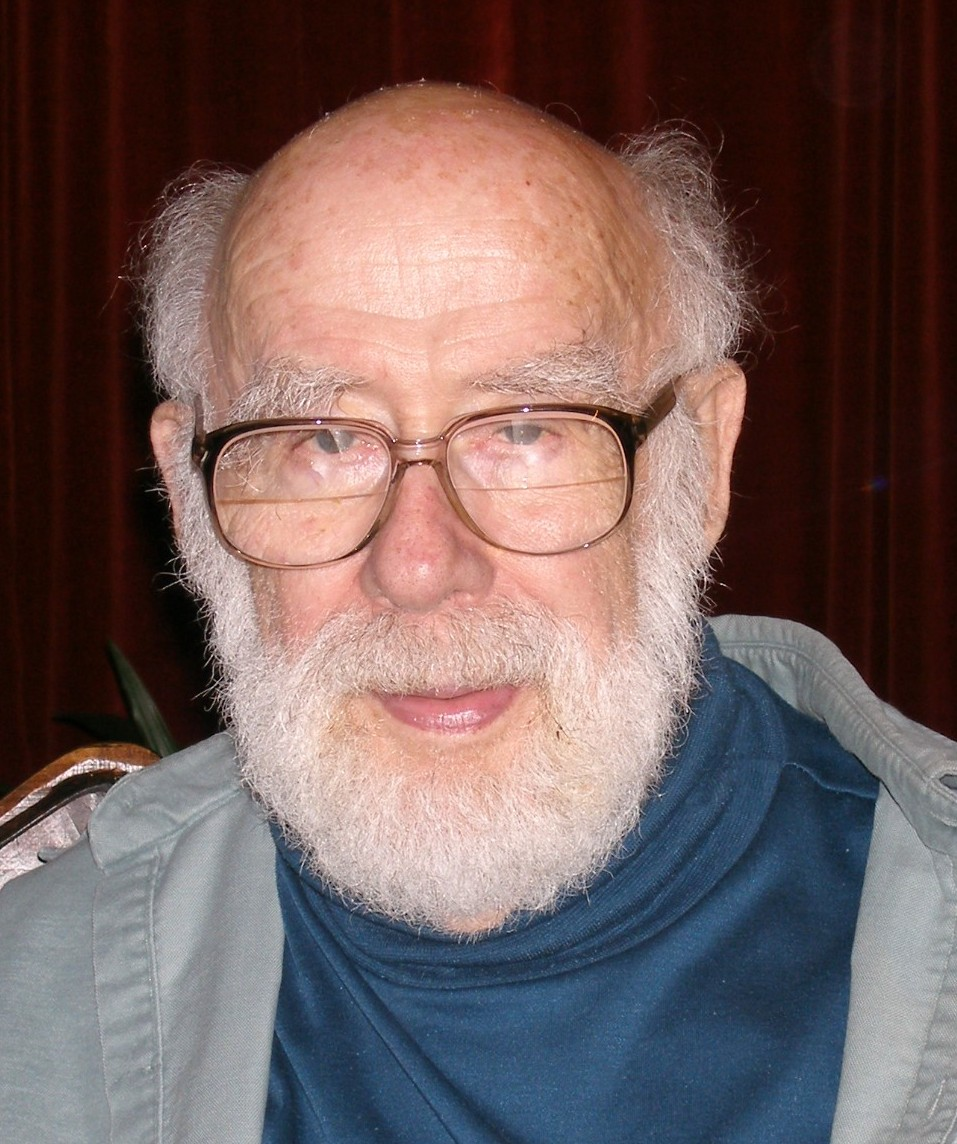
- John Gofman at his home in San Francisco in August 2005
- Born: September 21, 1918; Cleveland, Ohio
- Died: August 15, 2007 (aged 88); San Francisco, California
- Citizenship: United States
- Education: Oberlin College (Bachelor's); University of California at Berkeley (Ph.D); University of California, San Francisco (M.D.)
- Awards: Right Livelihood Award
- Scientific career
- Fields: Biology, Chemistry, Physics, Medicine
- Thesis: The discovery of Pa-232, U-232, Pa-233, and U-233. The slow and fast neutron fissionability of U-233. (1943)
- Doctoral advisor: Glenn T. Seaborg

John William Gofman (21 September 1918 – 15 August 2007) was an American scientist and advocate. He was professor emeritus of Molecular and Cell Biology at the University of California at Berkeley.

Gofman pioneered the field of clinical lipidology, and in 2007 was honored by the Journal of Clinical Lipidology with the title of "Father of Clinical Lipidology". With Frank T. Lindgren and other research associates, Gofman discovered and described three major classes of plasma lipoproteins, fat molecules that carry cholesterol in the blood. The team he led at the Donner Laboratory went on to demonstrate the role of lipoproteins in the causation of heart disease.

Gofman advocated for the adoption of the Linear No-Threshold (LNT) model as a means of estimating actual cancer risks from low-level radiation and as the foundation of the international guidelines for radiation protection.

Gofman's earliest research was in nuclear physics and chemistry, in close connection with the Manhattan Project. He codiscovered several radioisotopes, notably uranium-233 and its fissionability; he was the third person ever to work with plutonium and, having devised an early process for separating plutonium from fission products at J. Robert Oppenheimer's request, he was the first chemist ever to try to isolate milligram quantities of plutonium.

In 1963 Gofman established the Biomedical Research Division for the Livermore National Laboratory, where he researched the connection between chromosomal abnormalities and cancer.

Later in life, Gofman became an anti-nuclear advocate. Beginning in 1971, he was Chairman of the Committee for Nuclear Responsibility. He was awarded the Right Livelihood Award for "his pioneering work in exposing the health effects of low-level radiation" on the Chernobyl disaster's area population.

In his 1996 book Gofman claimed that exposure to medical x-rays was responsible for about 75 percent of breast cancers in the United States. This order of magnitude has been somehow confirmed by the increase in breast cancer incidence following mammography screening in the US and in France.

== Research ==
John Gofman graduated from Oberlin College with a bachelor's in chemistry in 1939, and received a doctorate in nuclear and physical chemistry from Berkeley in 1943, where he worked as a graduate student under Glenn T. Seaborg. In his PhD dissertation, Gofman described the discovery of radioisotopes protactinium-232, uranium-232, protactinium-233, as well as uranium-233 and the characterization of its fissionability.

Gofman shared three patents with collaborators on their discoveries :

- n° 3,123,535 (Glenn T. Seaborg, John W. Gofman, Raymond W. Stoughton): The slow and fast neutron fissionability of uranium-233, with its application to production of nuclear power or nuclear weapons.
- n° 2,671,251 (John W. Gofman, Robert E. Connick, Arthur C. Wahl): The sodium uranyl acetate process for the separation of plutonium in irradiated fuel from uranium and fission products.
- n° 2,912,302 (Robert E. Connick, John W. Gofman, George C. Pimentel): The columbium oxide process for the separation of plutonium in irradiated fuel from uranium and fission products.

Gofman later became the group co-leader of the Plutonium Project, an offshoot of the Manhattan Project.

Dr. Gofman earned his medical degree from the University of California, San Francisco, in 1946. After that, he and his collaborators investigated the body's lipoproteins, which contain both proteins and fats, and their circulation within the bloodstream. The researchers described low-density and high-density lipoproteins and their roles in metabolic disorders and coronary disease. This work continued throughout the late 1940s and early 1950s.

=== Establishment of LLNL's Medical Department ===
At the request of Ernest Lawrence, Gofman established the Medical Department at the Lawrence Livermore National Laboratory (LLNL) in early 1954 and acted as the medical director until 1957.

== Opposition to nuclear power ==
Gofman retired as a teaching professor in 1973 and became a professor emeritus of molecular and cell biology.

Gofman used his low-level radiation health model to predict 333 excess cancer or leukemia deaths from the 1979 Three Mile Island accident.

Three months after the Chernobyl disaster, Gofman predicted that Chernobyl would cause "475,000 fatal cancers plus about an equal number of additional non-fatal cases, occurring over time both inside and outside the ex-Soviet Union".

== Birth and death ==
Gofman was born in Cleveland, Ohio to Jewish parents, David and Sarah Gofman, who immigrated to the US from the Russian Empire in about 1905. His father had been "involved in some of the early revolutionary activities against the Czar." Gofman died of heart failure at age 88 on August 15, 2007, in his home in San Francisco.

== Bibliography ==
- Dietary Prevention and Treatment of Heart Disease, (with E. Virginia Dobbin and Alex V. Nichols), 256 pages, 1958, Putnam
- What we do know about heart attacks, 180 pages, 1958, Putnam
- Coronary heart disease, 363 pages, 1959, Charles C. Thomas
- Population control through nuclear pollution,(with Arthur R. Tamplin, Ph.D.) 242 pages, 1970, Nelson Hall Co.
- Poisoned Power, The Case Against Nuclear Power Plants Before and After Three Mile Island (with Arthur R. Tamplin, Ph.D.), 1971, 1979
- Irrevy: an irreverent, illustrated view of nuclear power, 1979, Committee for Nuclear Responsibility, ISBN 0-932682-00-6
- Radiation And Human Health, 908 pages, 1981
- X-Rays: Health Effects of Common Exams (with Egan O'Connor), 439 pages, 1985
- Radiation-Induced Cancer From Low-Dose Exposure: An Independent Analysis 480 pages, 1990
- Chernobyl Accident: Radiation Consequences for This and Future Generations, 574 pages, 1994
- Preventing Breast Cancer: The Story of a Major, Proven, Preventable Cause of this Disease 1996
- Radiation from Medical Procedures in the Pathogenesis of Cancer and Ischemic Heart Disease: Dose-Response Studies with Physicians per 100,000 Population 1999

== Interviews / Speeches ==
- "Poisoned power / Dr. John Gofman", interview by Elizabeth Eielson, KFPA, 1973. Listen a 20-minute excerpt (beginning at 8:55).
- Sally Smith Hughes, "John Gofman: Medical Research and Radiation Politics", The Bancroft Library, University of California, Berkeley, Oral History Interviews, Medical Physics Series, 1980
- Leslie J. Freeman, John W. Gofman - Medical Physicist, in Nuclear Witnesses - Insiders speak out, 1981
- Pat Stone, John Gofman: Nuclear and Anti-Nuclear Scientist, Mother Earth News, March–April 1981
- Carole Gallagher, American Ground Zero - The Secret Nuclear War, Random House New York, 1993, p. 294-303, conducted in March 1992
- Right Livelihood Award acceptance speech, December 9, 1992
- California Monthly: A Conversation with Dr. John Gofman, 1993
- Gofman on the health effects of radiation, Synapse, vol 38 n°16, January 20, 1994
- Fred Gardner, Shobhit Arora, Dr. Strangelove's Nemesis, Counterpunch, 2008, transcript of a 1994 interview
- US DOE Office of Human Radiation Experiments, Oral history of Dr. John W. Gofman, December 20, 1994
- Studs Terkel, "Coming of age - The Story of Our Century by Those Who've Lived It", 1995
- Video "Radioactive Berkeley: No Safe Dose", December 1996
- Dirty Harry: When the American Dream Became a Nightmare, Part 2, Gofman's short interview at 14:55

== Awards ==
- Gold-Headed Cane Award, University of California Medical School, 1946, presented to the graduating senior who most fully personifies the qualities of a "true physician."
- Modern Medicine Award, 1954, for outstanding contributions to heart disease research.
- The Lyman Duff Lectureship Award of the American Heart Association in 1965, for research in atherosclerosis and coronary heart disease; lecture published in 1966 as "Ischemic Heart Disease, Atherosclerosis, and Longevity," in Circulation 34: 679–697.
- The Stouffer Prize (shared) 1972, for outstanding contributions to research in arteriosclerosis.
- American College of Cardiology, 1974; selection as one of twenty-five leading researchers in cardiology of the past quarter-century.
- University of California, Berkeley, Bancroft Library, 1988; announcement of the "Gofman Papers" established in the History of Science and Technology Special Collection (October 1988, Bancroftiana, No. 97: 10–11).
- Right Livelihood Award, 1992
- Honored Speaker for the Meeting of the Arteriosclerosis Section of the American Heart Association, 1993

== See also ==
- Linus Pauling
- Alice Stewart
- Ernest Sternglass
- Linear no-threshold model
- Edward B. Lewis
