= Daniel Coit Gilman Summer House =

Historic house in Maine, United States

- U.S. National Register of Historic Places
- U.S. National Historic Landmark
- Location within Maine Location within the United States
- Location: Off Huntington Rd., Northeast Harbor, Maine
- Coordinates: 44°17′30″N 68°16′56″W
- Area: 1.9 acres (0.77 ha)
- Architect: Daniel Coit Gilman
- NRHP reference No.: 66000093

Significant dates
- Added to NRHP: October 15, 1966
- Designated NHL: December 21, 1965

Daniel Coit Gilman Summer House, also known as Over Edge, is a historic house on Huntington Lane, a private road off Huntington Road in Northeast Harbor, Maine. It was designated a National Historic Landmark in 1965 for its association with Daniel Coit Gilman (1831–1908), the president of Johns Hopkins University and a leading advocate of graduate education in the United States. The house is still used as a private summer residence.

== Description and history ==
The Gilman House is set on a high bluff, overlooking the town of Northeast Harbor's harbor area to the east, with views extending south toward Bear and Sutton Islands. It is a three-story wood-frame structure, clad in wooden shingles, with a side gable roof large enough to house the full third floor. The house is oriented to the waterfront, with an open veranda across the eastern facade, and porches on the north side of the first and second floors. The living room, which takes up the southern part of the house, has a projecting bay window. The house is little-altered since it was built in 1880s, the principal alteration being the removal of some partitions to enlarge the kitchen.

The house was built for Daniel Coit Gilman, and was his summer residence until his death in 1908. Gilman was a native of Norwich, Connecticut, who graduated from Yale College in 1848. He helped to organize Yale's Sheffield Scientific School in 1855, and became the school's librarian and secretary, as well as teaching geography as a professor. He became president of the recently founded University of California at Berkeley in 1872, but left that school over disagreements on curriculum. He was appointed president of the newly founded Johns Hopkins University in 1875, where he was able to implement ideas about high level competence in subject material by its professors, a high-quality student body, and the importance of academic freedom and research in the university setting. The success of these ideas was demonstrated by their wide adoption by other academic institutions, and by the presence of Johns Hopkins graduates in the professorial ranks of more than 60 schools by 1892.

== See also ==
- List of National Historic Landmarks in Maine
- National Register of Historic Places listings in Hancock County, Maine
