= Raymond W. Stoughton =

American nuclear chemist (1916–2003)

- Born: Raymond Woodford Stoughton; August 6, 1916; Tehachapi, California, U.S.
- Died: October 25, 2003 (aged 87); Iloilo City, Philippines
- Education: University of California, Berkeley (B.S. 1937, Ph.D. 1940)
- Known for: Co-discovery of uranium-233 Thermodynamics of aqueous electrolyte solutions at elevated temperatures
- Scientific career
- Fields: Nuclear chemistry, physical chemistry
- Workplaces: Radiation Laboratory, Berkeley; Metallurgical Laboratory, Chicago; Oak Ridge National Laboratory

Raymond Woodford Stoughton (August 6, 1916 – October 25, 2003) was an American nuclear chemist, one of the three co-discoverers of uranium-233 and for thirty-five years a researcher at Oak Ridge National Laboratory (ORNL). A history of the laboratory published by the University of Tennessee Press describes him as "the ORNL chemist who codiscovered uranium-233".

Working at the Radiation Laboratory in Gilman Hall at the University of California, Berkeley in 1941 and early 1942, Stoughton, Glenn T. Seaborg and John W. Gofman identified uranium-233 and demonstrated that it is fissile, establishing it as a third fissile material alongside uranium-235 and plutonium-239. Their findings were reported to the Uranium Committee in April 1942 but, because of wartime secrecy, were withheld from open publication until 1947. The American Chemical Society names all three men as responsible for the work.

Stoughton moved to ORNL in 1943 and remained there until his retirement in 1978. His later research was chiefly in physical chemistry: with M. H. Lietzke he published a long series of studies on the thermodynamics of aqueous electrolyte solutions at elevated temperatures, and with J. Halperin he compiled widely used neutron cross section data for heavy nuclides. In October 1968 ORNL's Molten-Salt Reactor Experiment became the first reactor in the world to run on uranium-233; on 8 October, Seaborg — by then chairman of the Atomic Energy Commission — joined Stoughton at the reactor to raise it to power.

== Early life and education ==
Stoughton was born on August 6, 1916 in Tehachapi, California. He studied chemistry at the University of California, Berkeley, where he was a member of the College of Chemistry by 1936 and took his B.S. in 1937. He remained at Berkeley as a graduate student and teaching assistant in chemistry from 1937 to 1940, receiving his Ph.D. in chemistry in 1940.

His doctoral-era research was in physical chemistry with Gerald K. Rollefson, with whom he published a three-part study of the quenching of fluorescence in solution between 1939 and 1941; Stoughton was first author of the first two papers. He gave his fields of research at the time as photochemistry, reaction kinetics, fluorescence and radioactivity.

Stoughton spent the academic year 1940–41 as an instructor in chemistry at the Agricultural and Mechanical College of Texas, returning to Berkeley in 1941 as a research chemist at the Radiation Laboratory. It was in this position — described in Seaborg's published journals as a postdoctoral appointment — that he joined the uranium-233 work.

== Uranium-233 ==
In 1941 and early 1942, Seaborg, Gofman and Stoughton studied the nuclear properties of uranium-233, an isotope produced by neutron capture in thorium. They established that it undergoes fission with slow neutrons, making it a potential nuclear fuel and a third fissile material alongside uranium-235 and plutonium-239. Their report was mailed from Berkeley to the Uranium Committee in Washington on April 14, 1942. Because of wartime secrecy the results were not published openly until 1947, when they appeared in Physical Review in abridged form "for historical purposes". A 2013 survey of the discovery of uranium isotopes in Atomic Data and Nuclear Data Tables cites this paper as the discovery of uranium-233.

The work was carried out at Gilman Hall, the Berkeley chemistry building where Seaborg, Joseph W. Kennedy, Edwin McMillan and Arthur Wahl had identified the first isotope of plutonium in February 1941. In the booklet marking Gilman Hall's designation as a National Historic Chemical Landmark, the American Chemical Society records that the plutonium discovery "was followed by the preparation of a new fissionable isotope of uranium (U-233) by Seaborg, J. W. Gofman, and R. W. Stoughton".

Seaborg, Gofman and Stoughton were jointly granted U.S. Patent 3,123,535, "Device for the production of nuclear energy from U-233", which was filed on November 30, 1944 and — like the paper — held under secrecy, issuing only in 1964.

Seaborg later wrote in his published journals that Stoughton was among those who shared with him recognition as co-discoverers of the fissionable nature of uranium-233.

== Oak Ridge National Laboratory ==
In 1943 Stoughton left Berkeley for the Metallurgical Laboratory at the University of Chicago, the Manhattan Project's center for plutonium chemistry, where he worked as a research chemist. Later the same year he moved to Oak Ridge, Tennessee, joining the Chemistry Division of Clinton Laboratories — operated by the University of Chicago until 1945 and renamed Oak Ridge National Laboratory in 1948 — where he remained for the rest of his career. During the war he was a civilian with the Office of Scientific Research and Development. Around 1949 he undertook a recruiting trip for the division, which hired eight to ten young doctoral chemists that year; during the trip he contracted polio.

In July 1945 Stoughton was one of 67 scientists at Clinton Laboratories who signed the Oak Ridge version of the Szilárd petition, which recommended that before the atomic bomb was used "without restriction" its power "should be adequately described and demonstrated" and Japan given the opportunity to consider the consequences of further refusal to surrender.

In 1948 Stoughton was chairman of the Association of Oak Ridge Engineers and Scientists (AORES), the Oak Ridge chapter of the Federation of American Scientists, during the controversy over security clearances and congressional investigations of atomic scientists. In September of that year the association issued a statement that about forty percent of the laboratory's senior physicists and chemists had resigned in recent months, naming fear of loyalty attacks as a chief reason. Writing on the association's behalf to Senator Bourke B. Hickenlooper of the Joint Committee on Atomic Energy, Stoughton argued that although scientists' resignation letters usually cited other job offers, the security environment had played an important part in their decisions, and he urged other scientists' associations to write to the committee as well. In a letter to David E. Lilienthal, chairman of the Atomic Energy Commission, he held the commission's own security procedures more responsible for the demoralization of project scientists than the House Un-American Activities Committee. Privately he acknowledged that the commission's decision of December 1947 to move the reactor program to Chicago had been a still more important reason for the departures. The historian Jessica Wang notes that although Stoughton and others stayed at Oak Ridge, the association did little further on loyalty and security issues after the end of 1948.

=== Solution chemistry at elevated temperatures ===
Much of Stoughton's ORNL research concerned the behavior of aqueous solutions at high temperature and pressure, work of direct relevance to the aqueous homogeneous reactor program. In a collaboration with M. H. Lietzke that ran from the early 1950s into the 1970s he published on electromotive force measurements in aqueous solutions at elevated temperatures, the solubility of silver sulfate in electrolyte solutions, the second dissociation constant of sulfuric acid, and methods for predicting activity and osmotic coefficients of concentrated electrolyte mixtures. With Lietzke and Raymond Fuoss he proposed a "two-structure" model for electrolyte solutions in the Proceedings of the National Academy of Sciences. He also applied this work to the thermodynamic properties of sea-salt solutions, relevant to desalination.

Earlier, with R. A. Day and W. C. Waggener, he published a series on the chemistry of thorium in aqueous solutions.

=== Thorium fuel cycle and uranium-233 breeding ===
From the late 1940s into the 1960s Stoughton worked on the chemistry and nuclear physics of breeding uranium-233 from thorium, the fuel cycle based on the isotope he had helped identify. With J. Halperin he examined the effects of transmutation products on the operation of a uranium-233 breeder reactor and the build-up of heavy isotopes in its core. With M. H. Lietzke he assessed chemical forms suitable for a thorium breeder blanket, and he lectured on breeder blanket problems in an Oak Ridge course on reactor technology. With L. I. Katzin he developed a procedure for isolating protactinium — whose isotope protactinium-233 is the intermediate in the conversion of thorium to uranium-233 — from irradiated thorium. He also measured neutron cross sections relevant to the cycle, including the effective capture cross section of protactinium-233, the thermal neutron absorption cross section of thorium-233, and the capture-to-fission ratio of uranium-233 for epithermal neutrons.

=== Nuclear data ===
With J. Halperin, Stoughton compiled neutron cross section data for heavy nuclides of interest to thermal reactors, and analyzed effective cadmium cut-off energies for neutron filters — reference material for reactor physics. Later in his career he took part in searches for superheavy elements, including an examination of samples of Madagascar monazite reported in Physical Review Letters.

=== Molten-Salt Reactor Experiment ===
In October 1968 the fuel of ORNL's Molten-Salt Reactor Experiment (MSRE) was changed from uranium-235 to uranium-233, making it the first reactor in the world to run on that isotope. On 8 October, Seaborg — then chairman of the Atomic Energy Commission — traveled to Oak Ridge and, in the words of the laboratory's fiftieth-anniversary history, "joined Raymond Stoughton, the Laboratory chemist who co-discovered uranium-233, to raise the reactor to full power".

Reporting the event in his annual State of the Laboratory address that December, ORNL director Alvin Weinberg said that "the reactor was brought to power for the first time by AEC Chairman Seaborg on October 8 with R. W. Stoughton, co-discoverer of ^{233}U, looking on". Paul Haubenreich, who directed the MSRE, recalled in a 2003 oral history that Seaborg came to the reactor "along with Ray Stoughton, (an ORNL researcher) who discovered U-233 in California", and that "we pulled the control rods and had the first and only reactor operating on U-233".

== Later life ==
Stoughton married in 1943 and had two sons and two daughters. He retired from ORNL in 1978. He died on October 25, 2003 in Iloilo City, Philippines, at the age of 87.

== Selected publications ==
- Stoughton, R. W.; Rollefson, G. K. (1939). "The Influence of Ionic Strength on the Quenching of Fluorescence in Aqueous Solutions". Journal of the American Chemical Society 61 (10): 2634–2638. doi:10.1021/ja01265a018
- Seaborg, G. T.; Gofman, J. W.; Stoughton, R. W. (1947). "Nuclear Properties of U^{233}: A New Fissionable Isotope of Uranium". Physical Review 71 (6): 378–379. doi:10.1103/PhysRev.71.378.2
- Seaborg, G. T.; Gofman, J. W.; Stoughton, R. W. (1949). "Nuclear Properties of U^{233}: A New Fissionable Isotope of Uranium". In Seaborg, G. T.; Katz, J. J.; Manning, W. M. (eds.). The Transuranium Elements. National Nuclear Energy Series, Manhattan Project Technical Section, Division IV — Plutonium Project Record, Vol. 14B, Part II, Paper 19.13. New York: McGraw-Hill. p. 1426.
- Day, R. A.; Stoughton, R. W. (1950). "Chemistry of Thorium in Aqueous Solutions. I. Some Organic and Inorganic Complexes". Journal of the American Chemical Society 72 (12): 5662–5666. doi:10.1021/ja01168a084
- Stoughton, R. W.; Halperin, J. (1959). "Heavy Nuclide Cross Sections of Particular Interest to Thermal Reactor Operation". Nuclear Science and Engineering 6 (2): 100–118. doi:10.13182/NSE59-A25572
- Lietzke, M. H.; Stoughton, R. W.; Young, T. F. (1961). "The Bisulfate Acid Constant from 25 to 225° as Computed from Solubility Data". The Journal of Physical Chemistry 65 (12): 2247–2249. doi:10.1021/j100829a029
- Lietzke, M. H.; Stoughton, R. W.; Fuoss, R. M. (1968). "A Two-Structure Model for Electrolytic Solutions". Proceedings of the National Academy of Sciences 59 (1): 39–45. doi:10.1073/pnas.59.1.39

== Patents ==
- U.S. patent 3,123,535 — Seaborg, G. T.; Gofman, J. W.; Stoughton, R. W. "Device for the production of nuclear energy from U-233". Filed November 30, 1944; issued March 3, 1964.
- U.S. patent 2,849,283 — Stoughton, R. W. "Separation of uranyl nitrate by extraction".
- U.S. patent 2,856,262 — Stoughton, R. W. "Adsorption procedure in preparing U-233".
- U.S. patent 2,970,035 — Stoughton, R. W. "Separation of plutonium ions from solution by adsorption on zirconium pyrophosphate".
- U.S. patent 3,005,681 — Stoughton, R. W. "Separating plutonium (IV) from uranium and fission products".
