= Clinical Cardiology =

- Discipline: Cardiology
- Language: English
- Edited by: A. John Camm, editor-in-chief; Christopher P. Cannon, deputy editor-in-chief

Publication details
- History: 1978–present
- Publisher: John Wiley & Sons
- Frequency: Monthly
- Impact factor: 2.882 (2020)

Standard abbreviations
- ISO 4: Clin. Cardiol.

Indexing
- CODEN: CLCADC
- ISSN: 0160-9289 (print); 1932-8737 (web)
- LCCN: sc80000325
- OCLC no.: 848831055

Links
- Journal homepage; Online access; Online archive

Clinical Cardiology is a monthly peer-reviewed medical journal covering cardiology that was established in 1978. It is published by John Wiley & Sons and the editor-in-chief is A. John Camm (St George's, University of London). It is an official journal of the American Society for Preventive Cardiology.

According to the Journal Citation Reports, the journal has a 2020 impact factor of 2.882.
