= Journal of Clinical Lipidology =

- Discipline: Biochemistry, metabolism
- Language: English
- Edited by: Kevin Maki, P.B. Duell

Publication details
- History: 2007–present
- Publisher: Elsevier
- Frequency: Bimonthly
- Impact factor: 3.580 (2017)

Standard abbreviations
- ISO 4: J. Clin. Lipidol.

Indexing
- ISSN: 1933-2874 (print); 1876-4789 (web)
- LCCN: 2006212893
- OCLC no.: 700197868

Links
- Journal homepage; Online access; Online archive

The Journal of Clinical Lipidology is a bimonthly peer-reviewed medical journal covering medical aspects of lipidology. It was established in 2007 and is the official journal of the National Lipid Association. It is published by Elsevier and the editor-in-chiefs are Kevin Maki and P.B. Duell. According to the Journal Citation Reports, the journal has a 2017 impact factor of 3.580.
