= Uranium-233 =

Isotope of uranium

- An ampoule containing solidified pieces of a FLiBe and uranium-233 tetrafluoride mixture

General
- Symbol: ^{233}U
- Names: uranium-233
- Protons (Z): 92
- Neutrons (N): 141

Nuclide data
- Half-life (t_{1/2}): 159,200 years
- Isotope mass: 233.03963 Da
- Parent isotopes: ^{237}Pu (α)^{233}Np (EC)^{233}Pa (β^{−})
- Decay products: ^{229}Th

Decay modes
- Decay mode: Decay energy (MeV)
- Alpha: 4.909

Uranium-233 (^{233}U or U-233) is a fissile isotope of uranium that is bred from thorium-232 as part of the thorium fuel cycle. Uranium-233 was investigated for use in nuclear weapons and as a reactor fuel. It has been used successfully in experimental nuclear reactors and has been proposed for much wider use as a nuclear fuel. It decays primarily by alpha emission, with a half-life of about 159,200 years, and is part of the neptunium decay chain.

Uranium-233 is produced by the neutron irradiation of thorium-232. When thorium-232 absorbs a neutron, it becomes thorium-233, which has a half-life of about 22 minutes. Thorium-233 decays into protactinium-233 through beta decay. Protactinium-233 has a longer half-life of about 27 days to further decay into uranium-233; some proposed molten salt reactor designs attempt to physically isolate the protactinium from further neutron capture before beta decay can occur, to maintain the neutron economy.

^{233}U usually fissions on neutron absorption, but sometimes retains the neutron, becoming uranium-234. At a neutron energy of 0.0253 eV, JENDL-4.0 data give capture-to-fission ratios of about 0.085 for uranium-233, 0.169 for uranium-235 and 0.363 for plutonium-239.

== History ==
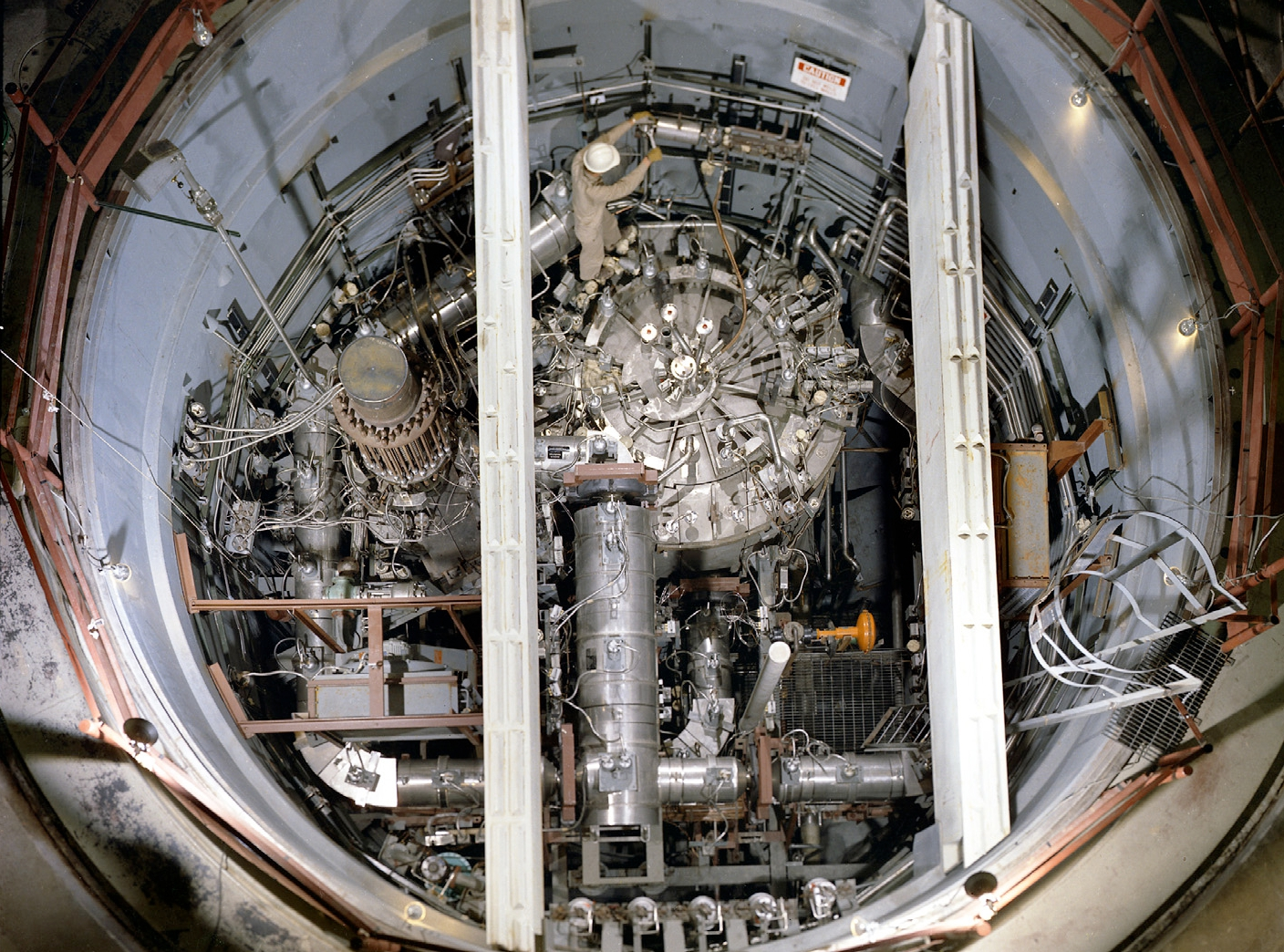
Molten-Salt Reactor Experiment

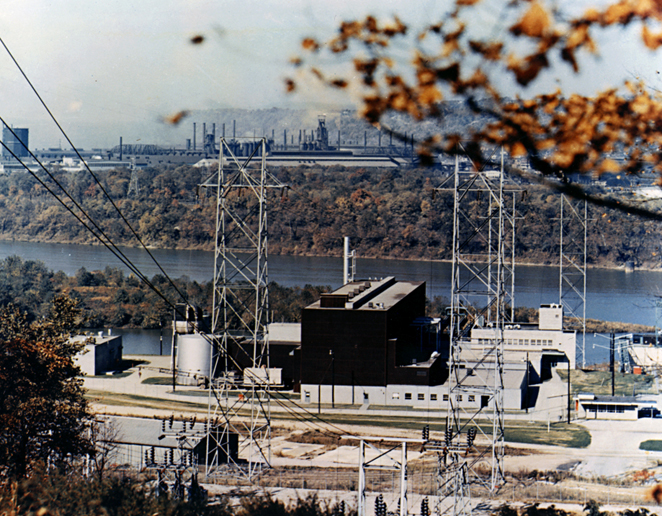
Shippingport Atomic Power Station

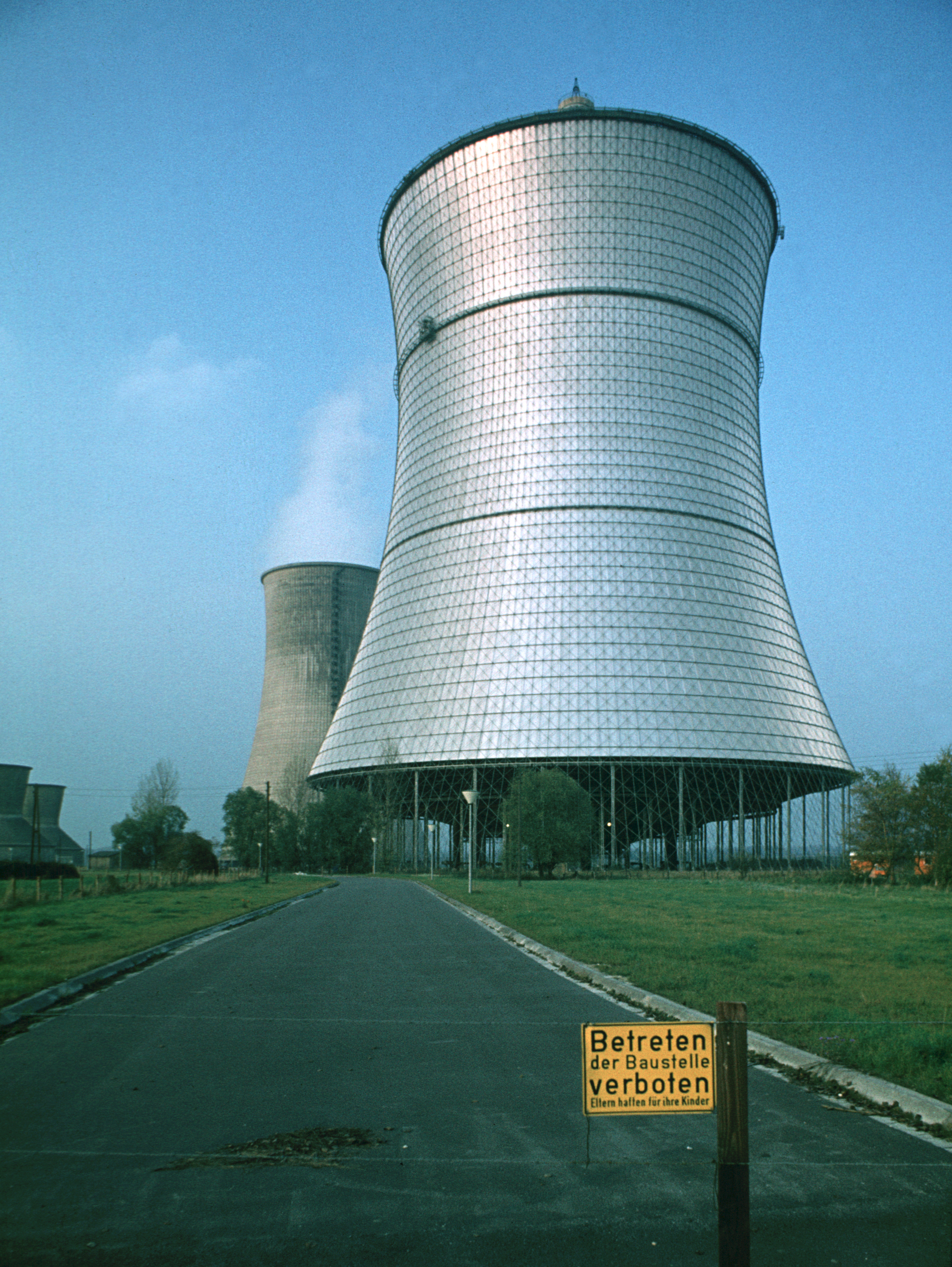
German THTR-300

The fissile properties of uranium-233 were established at the University of California, Berkeley during 1941 and early 1942 by Glenn T. Seaborg, John W. Gofman and Raymond W. Stoughton, who showed that the isotope undergoes fission with slow neutrons and was therefore a potential nuclear fuel. Their report was mailed to the Uranium Committee in Washington on 14 April 1942, but wartime secrecy kept the work from open publication until 1947, when an abridged version appeared in Physical Review.

In 1946, the public first became informed of uranium-233 bred from thorium as "a third available source of nuclear energy and atom bombs" (in addition to uranium-235 and plutonium-239), following a United Nations report and a speech by Glenn T. Seaborg.

The United States produced, over the course of the Cold War, approximately 2 metric tons of uranium-233, in varying levels of chemical and isotopic purity. These were produced at the Hanford Site and Savannah River Site in reactors that were designed for the production of plutonium-239.

== Nuclear fuel ==
Uranium-233 has been used as fuel in several reactor types and has been proposed for use in new designs. Uranium-233 can be bred in either fast reactors or thermal reactors, unlike the uranium-238-based fuel cycles which require the superior neutron economy of a fast reactor in order to breed plutonium, that is, to produce more fissile material than is consumed.

In 1968, the Molten-Salt Reactor Experiment at Oak Ridge became the first reactor to operate on uranium-233.

The long-term strategy of the nuclear power program of India, which has substantial thorium reserves, is to move to a nuclear program breeding uranium-233 from thorium feedstock.

=== Energy released ===
The average energy released per fission of uranium-233 is about 197.9 MeV = 3.171·10^{−11} J (i.e. 19.09 TJ/mol = 81.95 TJ/kg = 22764 MWh/kg that is 1.8 million times more than the same mass of diesel).

Source	Average energy released (MeV)
Instantaneously released energy
Kinetic energy of fission fragments	168.2
Kinetic energy of prompt neutrons	4.8
Energy carried by prompt γ-rays	7.7
Energy from decaying fission products
Energy of β^{−} particles	5.2
Energy of anti-neutrinos	6.9
Energy of delayed γ-rays	5.0
Sum (excluding escaping anti-neutrinos)	191.0
Energy released when those prompt neutrons which don't (re)produce fission are captured	9.1
Energy converted into heat in an operating thermal nuclear reactor	200.1

== Weapon material ==
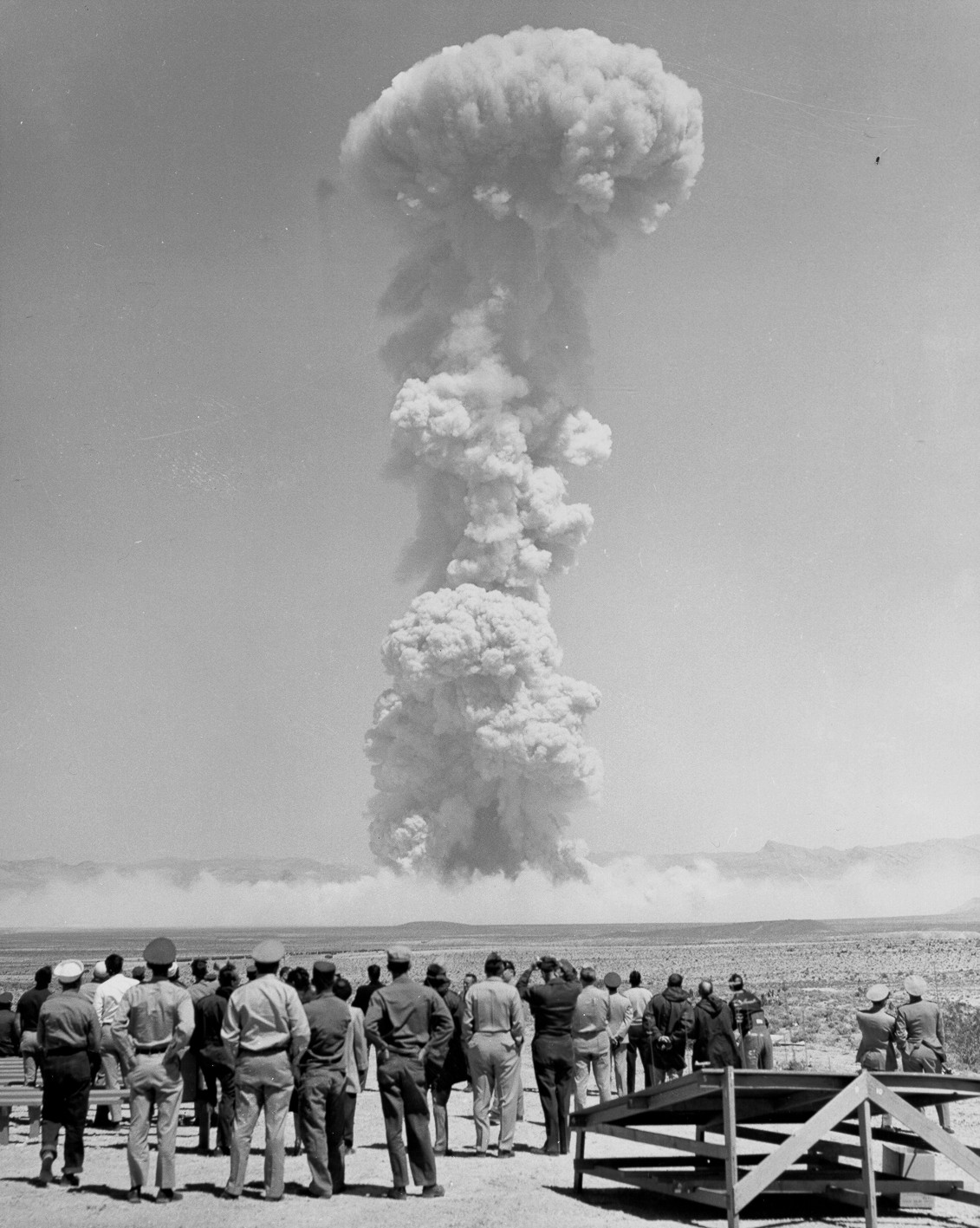
The first detonation of a nuclear bomb that included U-233, on 15 April 1955

As a potential weapon material, pure uranium-233 is more similar to plutonium-239 than uranium-235 in terms of source (bred vs natural), half-life and critical mass (both 4–5 kg in beryllium-reflected sphere). Unlike reactor-bred plutonium, it has a very low spontaneous fission rate, which combined with its low critical mass made it initially attractive for compact gun-type weapons, such as small-diameter artillery shells.

A declassified 1966 memo from the US nuclear program stated that uranium-233 has been shown to be highly satisfactory as a weapons material, though it was only superior to plutonium in rare circumstances. It was claimed that if the existing weapons were based on uranium-233 instead of plutonium-239, Livermore would not be interested in switching to plutonium.

The co-presence of uranium-232 can complicate the manufacture and use of uranium-233, though the Livermore memo indicates a likelihood that this complication can be worked around.

Chuck Hansen wrote in Swords of Armageddon that ^{233}U was evaluated by the United States for its ability to substitute for supergrade plutonium in nuclear weapons. As it was deemed equivalent to plutonium rather than superior to it, military interest in ^{233}U-based weapons waned in the late 1960s. However, several ^{233}U-based nuclear weapons were tested by the US between 1955 and 1968. The Rocky Flats Plant, which refined fissile materials for weapons production, was refining ^{233}U until the early 1980s.

While it is thus possible to use uranium-233 as the fissile material of a nuclear weapon, speculation aside, there is scant publicly available information on this isotope actually having been weaponized:

- The United States detonated an experimental device in the 1955 Operation Teapot "MET" test which used a plutonium/^{233}U composite pit; its design was based on the plutonium/^{235}U pit from the TX-7E, a prototype Mark 7 nuclear bomb design used in the 1951 Operation Buster-Jangle "Easy" test. Although not an outright fizzle, MET's actual yield of 22 kilotons was sufficiently below the predicted 33 kt that the information gathered was of limited value. The United States conducted several additional weapons tests with ^{233}U for unknown purposes.
- The Soviet Union detonated its first hydrogen bomb the same year, the RDS-37, which contained a fissile core of ^{235}U and ^{233}U.
- In 1998, as part of its Pokhran-II tests, India detonated an experimental ^{233}U device of low-yield (0.2 kt) called Shakti V.

The B Reactor and others at the Hanford Site optimized for the production of weapons-grade material have been used to manufacture ^{233}U. The United States Atomic Energy Commission used the weapons production reactors at Hanford to breed significant quantities of ^{233}U from thorium for use in both nuclear weapons and for civilian research. Overall the United States is thought to have produced two tons of ^{233}U, of various levels of purity, some with ^{232}U impurity content as low as 6 ppm.

The hazards are significant even at 5 parts per million. Implosion nuclear weapons require ^{232}U levels below 50 ppm (above which the ^{233}U is considered "low grade"; cf. "Standard weapon grade plutonium requires a ^{240}Pu content of no more than 6.5%." which is 65,000 ppm, and the analogous ^{238}Pu was produced in levels of 0.5% (5,000 ppm) or less). Gun-type fission weapons additionally need low levels (1 ppm range) of light impurities, to keep the neutron generation low.

The production of "clean" ^{233}U, low in ^{232}U, requires a few factors: 1) obtaining a relatively pure ^{232}Th source, low in ^{230}Th (which also transmutes to ^{232}U), 2) moderating the incident neutrons to have an energy not higher that 6 MeV (too-high energy neutrons cause the ^{232}Th (n,2n) → ^{231}Th reaction) and 3) removing the thorium sample from neutron flux before the ^{233}U concentration builds up to a too high level, in order to avoid fissioning the ^{233}U itself (which would produce energetic neutrons). The Molten-Salt Reactor Experiment (MSRE) used ^{233}U that contained 222 ppm ^{232}U.

== Further information ==
Thorium, from which ^{233}U is bred, is roughly three to four times more abundant in the Earth's crust than uranium. The decay chain of ^{233}U itself is part of the neptunium series, the decay chain of its grandparent ^{237}Np.

Uses for uranium-233 include the production of the medical isotopes actinium-225 and bismuth-213 which are among its daughters, low-mass nuclear reactors for space travel applications, use as an isotopic tracer, nuclear weapons research, and reactor fuel research including the thorium fuel cycle. Bismuth-213 has been investigated for use in cancer treatment. However, producing the medical isotopes from ^{233}U practically requires separating the long-lived intermediate thorium-229. At Oak Ridge, thorium-229 is recovered from stored uranium-233 and supplied to TerraPower Isotopes for the production of actinium-225 used in cancer-treatment research.

== See also ==
- Breeder reactor
- Liquid fluoride thorium reactor

== Notes ==
Lighter: uranium-232	Uranium-233 is an isotope of uranium	Heavier: uranium-234
Decay product of: plutonium-237 (α) neptunium-233 (β^{+}) protactinium-233 (β^{−})	Decay chain of uranium-233	Decays to: thorium-229 (α)
