= National Lipid Association =

American medical society

The National Lipid Association (NLA) is an American non-profit multidisciplinary medical society that aims to enhance the practice of lipid management in clinical medicine. The NLA focuses on the prevention of cardiovascular disease and other lipid-related disorders.

== Overview ==
The National Lipid Association was formed in 1997 and has over 2,000 members. It provides medical education for healthcare professionals and physicians to advance knowledge and certification in clinical lipidology. Joseph Saseen is the current president of NLA. In 2014, the NLA proposed a working definition of statin intolerance and made general recommendations for health professionals.

The NLA have stated that by 2012, a wealth of evidence including numerous clinical trials examined by the Cholesterol Treatment Trialists' Collaboration has confirmed the lipid hypothesis.

The NLA publishes the Journal of Clinical Lipidology.

== Scientific statements ==
In 2019, the NLA's Nutrition and Lifestyle Task Force published a scientific statement based on a comprehensive review of recent clinical evidence on the effects of low and very-low-carbohydrate diets on the management of body weight and other cardiometabolic risk factors. The statement concluded that low and very-low-carbohydrate die are not superior to other dietary approaches for weight loss and are difficult to maintain in the long term.

In 2021, the NLA published a scientific statement on lipid measurements in the management of cardiovascular diseases.

In 2022, the NLA published a scientific statement on statin intolerance, updating the definition which now classifies statin intolerance as either partial or complete. The 2022 statement recommends different strategies to help patients stay on statin medications, and alternative medications to those who cannot tolerate statins.

== Selected publications ==
- Cheeley MK, Saseen JJ, Agarwala A, Ravilla S, Ciffone N, Jacobson TA, Dixon DL, Maki KC (2022). "NLA scientific statement on statin intolerance: a new definition and key considerations for ASCVD risk reduction in the statin intolerant patient". J Clin Lipidol. 16 (4): 361–375. doi:10.1016/j.jacl.2022.05.068. PMID 35718660. S2CID 249868408.
