= American Society for Preventive Cardiology =

American non-profit organization

- Founded: 1985
- Founder: Joseph Stokes III
- Type: Nonprofit
- Legal status: 501(c)(3)
- Purpose: Promote the prevention of cardiovascular disease
- Headquarters: Kingwood, Texas
- Location: United States
- Key people: Michael Shapiro (President)
- Website: aspconline.org

The American Society for Preventive Cardiology (Note: The organization is also known as the American Society of Preventive Cardiology.) (ASPC) is a non-profit membership-based organization dedicated to educating health care professionals and patients about the prevention of cardiovascular disease.

== History ==
The American Society for Preventive Cardiology was established in 1985 under the guidance of Joseph Stokes III (1924–1989), a cardiologist who served as co-principal investigator of the Framingham Heart Study. The organization was founded through a working group of scientists from the National Heart, Lung, and Blood Institute who recommended curricula to facilitate medical school research aimed at preventing cardiovascular disease. The ASPC disseminated the National Institutes of Health Preventive Cardiology Academic Awards, which funded teaching preventive cardiology across 60 medical schools over a 17 year period. The ASPC has close connection with the American Heart Association (AHA) including its Council on Epidemiology and Prevention. Since 1994, the ASPC has presented annual debates at the American Heart Association Council on Epidemiology and Prevention scientific sessions. Members of the ASPC and AHA collaborated on the Women's Agenda Targeting Cholesterol in Heart Disease program.

In 2010, the ASPC attended the Great Wall International Congress of Cardiology in Beijing and the World Congress on Heart Disease sponsored by the International Academy of Cardiology. The ASPC has hosted an annual congress on cardiovascular disease prevention since 2012. The Stokes Award is issued to individuals by the ASPC who have demonstrated a lifetime achievement in preventive cardiology. In 2015 at the ASPC annual meeting in Boca Raton the first ASPC Experts Course in Preventive Cardiology was offered. A year later the ASPC accepted applications for its inaugural class of fellows which provided the first official fellowship certification in preventive cardiology for those who have a record of accomplishment and dedication in the field.

The ASPC describes its mission as "to promote the prevention of cardiovascular disease, advocate for the preservation of cardiovascular health, and disseminate high‐quality, evidence‐based information through the education of health care clinicians and their patients." It was granted 501(c)(3) status in 2007.

In 2023, the ASPC collaborated with ten other organizations including the American Heart Association and American Society of Echocardiography on new appropriate use criteria to evaluate chronic coronary disease. The ASPC and National Lipid Association have supported low-density lipoprotein (LDL-c) measurement as a performance metric to improve population-wide lipid control.

== Journals ==
In 2007, the ASPC adopted Preventive Cardiology as their official journal. Since 2011, the ASPC has published Clinical Cardiology by Wiley as their official journal. As of 2020 the ASPC also publishes The American Journal of Preventive Cardiology which has been credited with increasing the validation and use of coronary artery calcium scoring. It is published quarterly by Elsevier and is one of the only journals dedicated solely to preventive cardiology.

== Selected publications ==
- Belardo D, Michos ED, Blankstein R, Blumenthal RS, Ferdinand KC, Hall K, Klatt K, Natajaran P, Ostfeld RJ, Reddy K, Rodriguez R, Sriram U, Tobias DK, Gulati M. (2022). "Practical, Evidence-Based Approaches to Nutritional Modifications to Reduce Atherosclerotic Cardiovascular Disease: An American Society For Preventive Cardiology Clinical Practice Statement". Am J Prev Cardiol. 10 100323. doi:10.1016/j.ajpc.2022.100323. PMC 8914096. PMID 35284849.
- German CA, Baum SJ, Ferdinand KC, Gulati M, Polonsky TS, Toth PP, Shapiro MD. (2022). "Defining preventive cardiology: A clinical practice statement from the American Society for Preventive Cardiology". Am J Prev Cardiol. 12 100432. doi:10.1016/j.ajpc.2022.100432. PMC 9679464. PMID 36425534.
- Virani SS, Aspry K, Dixon DL, Ferdinand KC, Heidenreich PA, Jackson EJ, Jacobson TA, McAlister JL, Neff DR, Gulati M, Ballantyne CM. (2023). "The importance of low-density lipoprotein cholesterol measurement and control as performance measures: A joint Clinical Perspective from the National Lipid Association and the American Society for Preventive Cardiology". J Clin Lipidol. 17 (2): 208–218. doi:10.1016/j.jacl.2023.02.003. PMID 36965958.
- Chandra AA, Espiche C, Maliha M, Virani SS, Blumenthal RS, Rodriguez F, Wong ND, Gulati M, Slipczuk L, Shapiro MD. (2025). "American society for preventive cardiology 2024 cardiovascular disease prevention: Highlights and key sessions". Am J Prev Cardiol. 21 100919. doi:10.1016/j.ajpc.2024.100919. PMC 11722599. PMID 39802677.
