= Nuclear arms race =

Part of the post-WWII era and the Cold War

Nuclear arms race.
- Part of the post-WWII era and the Cold War
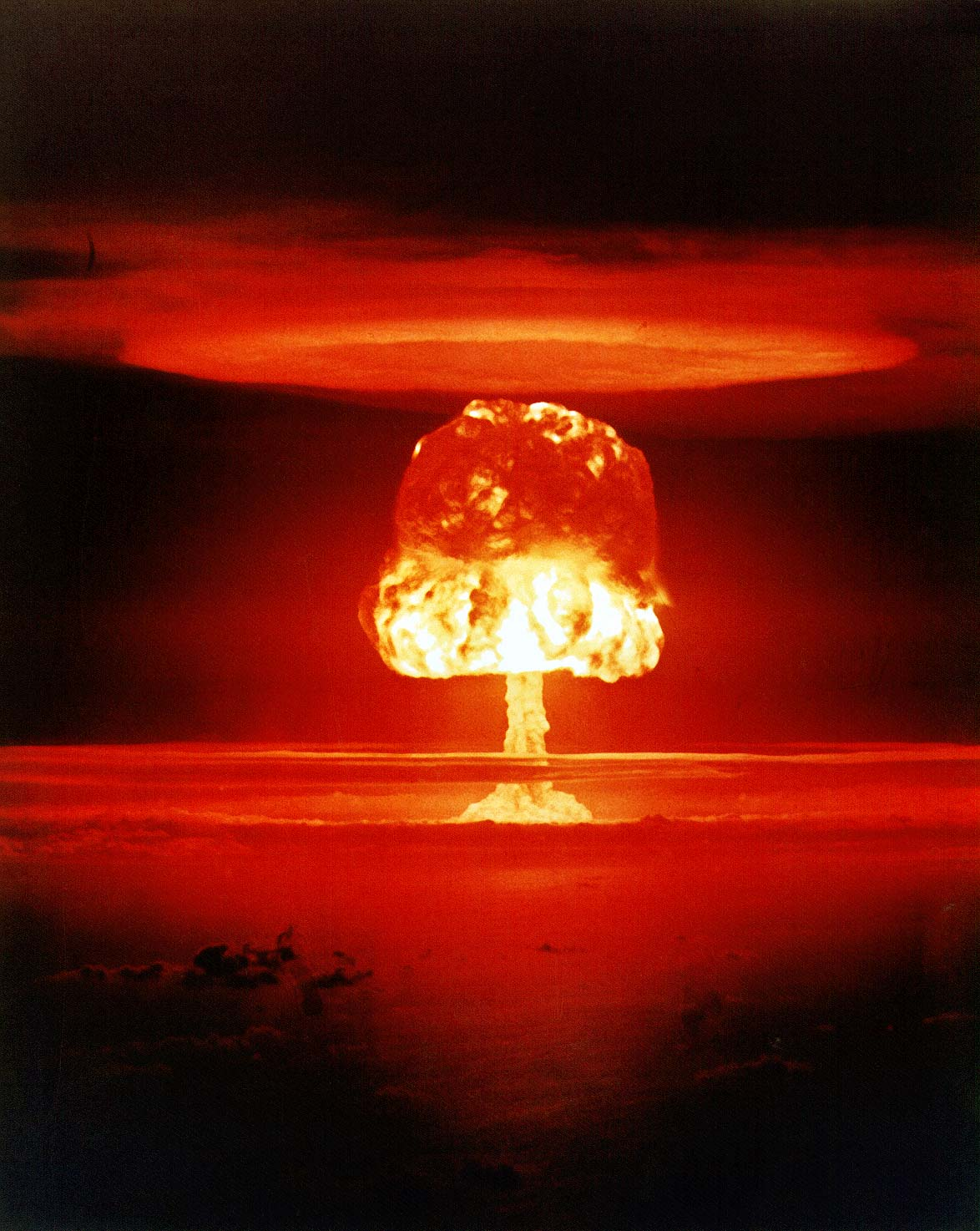
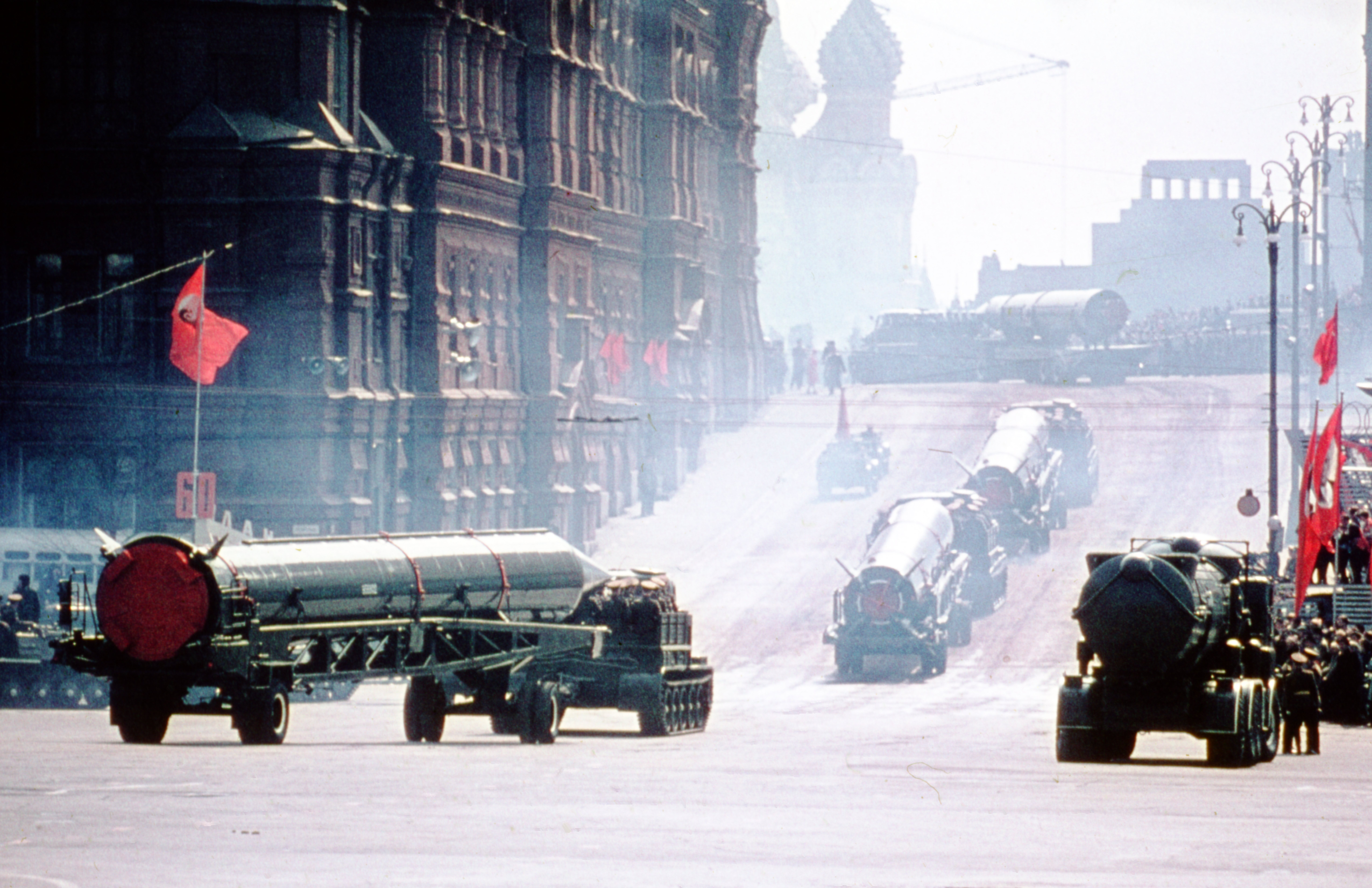
- Castle Romeo, testing the first deployed hydrogen bomb; Soviet R-12 MRBMs in Moscow
- Location: United States, Soviet Union, United Kingdom, China, France, Israel (undeclared), South Africa, India, Pakistan
- Result: Development of nuclear weapons by up to nine countries; United States, Russia, and China maintain large nuclear arsenals; Stationing of nuclear weapons in Western and Eastern Bloc countries; Over 2,000 nuclear weapons tests; Approximately 125,000 nuclear weapons produced; Ratification of nuclear arms reduction treaties

Nuclear weapons tests
- United States; Soviet Union; China; United Kingdom; France; India; Pakistan

United States and Soviet Union/Russia nuclear weapon stockpiles

The nuclear arms race was an arms race competition for supremacy in nuclear warfare between the United States, the Soviet Union, and their respective allies during the Cold War. During this same period, in addition to the American and Soviet nuclear stockpiles, other countries developed nuclear weapons, though no other country engaged in warhead production on nearly the same scale as the two superpowers.

The race began during World War II, dominated by the Western Allies' Manhattan Project and Soviet atomic spies. Following the atomic bombings of Hiroshima and Nagasaki, the Soviet Union accelerated its atomic bomb project, resulting in the RDS-1 test in 1949. Both sides then pursued an all-out effort, realizing deployable thermonuclear weapons by the mid-1950s. The arms race in nuclear testing culminated with the 1961 Tsar Bomba. Atmospheric testing was ended in the 1963 Partial Nuclear Test Ban Treaty. Subsequent work focused on warhead miniaturization, more lightweight and lower fallout designs, and variants of neutron bombs, led by Los Alamos and Livermore in the US and VNIIEF and VNIITF in the USSR.

Seven other countries developed nuclear weapons during the Cold War. The UK and France, both NATO members, developed fission and fusion weapons throughout the 1950s, and 1960s, respectively. China developed both against the backdrop of the Sino-Soviet split. Israel, India, Pakistan, and South Africa subsequently developed at least fission weapons.

Nuclear weapons delivery vehicles were a major field of competition. Initially strategic bombers were the only option. By 1960, both sides had developed intercontinental ballistic missiles and submarine-launched ballistic missiles, resulting in the nuclear triad. Additionally, smaller systems for tactical nuclear weapons delivery were extensively developed and deployed, including tactical ballistic missile and cruise missiles, nuclear artillery, demolition munitions, depth bombs, and torpedoes. Key regions of nuclear build-up included the Eastern European Warsaw Pact, NATO members West Germany, Italy, Greece, and Turkey, and US-allied Japan, South Korea, Taiwan, and the Philippines.

Confrontations with nuclear threats occurred during the Korean War, the First and Second Taiwan Strait Crises, the Berlin Crisis of 1961, and most significantly the Cuban Missile Crisis. Détente during the 1960s and 1970s limited the arms race, especially via the Non-Proliferation Treaty and Anti-Ballistic Missile Treaty. Tensions were renewed in the early 1980s, in the development and deployment to Europe of MRBMs, IRBMs, and supersonic strategic bombers, as well as the space-based Strategic Defense Initiative. Under the leadership of Mikhail Gorbachev, the USSR negotiated the Intermediate-Range Nuclear Forces Treaty and START I, until its dissolution in 1991 brought to an end the Cold War nuclear arms race.

Russia and the US maintain the world's largest nuclear stockpiles. The 1993 START II, 1996 CTBT, and 2010 New START treaties further curtailed the arms race in the post-Cold War period. Tensions have resurged in what is sometimes called a Second Cold War. The US-Russian INF and New START treaties broke down in 2019 and 2023, against the backdrop of the Russo-Ukrainian war, and Russia announced six "nuclear super weapons". In the Pacific, the US and China are in competition over hypersonic weapons.

== World War II ==
During World War II, four nuclear weapons research programs existed. The industrial Manhattan Project, directed by the US military and coordinated with the UK (Tube alloys) and Canada, developed the first nuclear weapons. More limited scientific research was carried out in the Soviet atomic bomb project, German nuclear program, and Japanese nuclear program.

=== Allied-German rivalry ===
From 1934, the Vemork hydroelectric station of Norsk Hydro Rjukan entered operation as the world's only industrial-scale production site for heavy water, suitable as a moderator for atomic pile experiments leading to nuclear reactors.

In early 1940, a French Deuxième Bureau agent arranged for the purchase of the entire Norwegian stock of heavy water, 187 liters. The Germans had offered the same purchase, but the French obtained the agreement of the Norwegian government after telling them of its military purpose. It was shipped to the Collège de France nuclear laboratory in Paris prior to the German invasion of Norway in April, but during the German invasion of France in June it was shipped to England. After various secret storages it was moved to the Cavendish Laboratory in Cambridge, for the work of refugee French nuclear physicists Hans von Halban and Lew Kowarski.

In February 1941, the Luftwaffe carried out a raid on Cambridge, hitting the Cavendish Laboratory. Kowarski said in a postwar interview that his and von Halban's work there on a heavy water-moderated atomic pile was specifically targeted in retaliation for a prior British raid on Heidelberg, where Walther Bothe and Arnold Flammersfeld were working on similar pile experiments at what is now the Max Planck Institute for Medical Research.

In February 1943, a Special Operations Executive-trained team of Norwegian commandos detonated explosive charges on the heavy-water electrolysis chambers at the Vemork hydroelectric plant during Operation Gunnerside. Along with other covert and bombing raids, the Allies successfully crippled heavy water moderator production for the German nuclear program.

In 1943, a US Office of Strategic Services operation named Project AZUSA aimed to interview Italian physicists to learn what they knew about German nuclear physicists Werner Heisenberg and Carl Friedrich von Weizsäcker. In December 1944, OSS spy Moe Berg travelled to Zurich where Heisenberg was giving a lecture, with orders to shoot Heisenberg with a concealed pistol if he deemed the German atomic bomb program close to completion.

=== US-Soviet rivalry ===
In the first half of 1945, as the Western theater was coming to a close, the US and Soviets competed over the intellectual and material resources of the German nuclear program, via the Alsos Mission and Russian Alsos. In March, Manhattan Project leader Leslie Groves ordered the Auergesellschaft plant in Oranienburg bombed, to deny the Soviets the refined natural uranium there. Nonetheless 100 tons were ultimately recovered and used for their early reactors. In April, the Western Allies captured the Haigerloch nuclear pile, showing the comparative limited nature of the German program. The majority of leading German scientists, including Werner Heisenberg and Paul Harteck, were captured by the Western Allies between May and June in Operation Epsilon. Alsos interrogated Fritz Houtermans, a German who had worked on nuclear research for Germany and the USSR, about the extent of the Soviet project. The Soviets captured Nikolaus Riehl, Gernot Zippe, and Max Steenbeck, of which the latter two were later crucial in developing the uranium hexafluoride gas centrifuge. During the occupation of Japan, Alsos also interrogated nuclear physicists, but found their work was limited to unsuccessful enrichment experiments.

The Soviet Union was not informed officially of the Manhattan Project until Stalin was briefed at the Potsdam Conference on July 24, 1945, by U.S. President Harry S. Truman, eight days after the first successful test of a nuclear weapon. Despite their wartime military alliance, the United States and Britain had not trusted the Soviets enough to keep knowledge of the Manhattan Project safe from German spies; there were also concerns that, as an ally, the Soviet Union would request and expect to receive technical details of the new weapon.

When President Truman informed Stalin of the weapons, he was surprised at how calmly Stalin reacted to the news and thought that Stalin had not understood what he had been told. Other members of the United States and British delegations who closely observed the exchange formed the same conclusion.

In fact, Stalin had long been aware of the program, despite the Manhattan Project's having a secret classification so high that, even as vice president, Truman did not know about it or the development of the weapons (Truman was not informed until shortly after he became president). A ring of spies operating within the Manhattan Project, (including Klaus Fuchs and Theodore Hall) had kept Stalin well informed of American progress. They provided the Soviets with detailed designs of the implosion bomb and the hydrogen bomb. Fuchs' arrest in 1950 led to the arrests of many other suspected Russian spies, including Harry Gold, David Greenglass, and Ethel and Julius Rosenberg; the latter two were tried and executed for espionage in 1951.

In August 1945, on Truman's orders, two atomic bombs were dropped on Japanese cities. The first bomb was dropped on Hiroshima, and the second bomb was dropped on Nagasaki by the B-29 bombers named Enola Gay and Bockscar respectively.

Shortly after the end of the Second World War in 1945, the United Nations was founded. During the United Nations' first General Assembly in London in January 1946, they discussed the future of nuclear weapons and created the United Nations Atomic Energy Commission. The goal of this assembly was to eliminate the use of all Nuclear weapons. The United States presented their solution, which was called the Baruch Plan. This plan proposed that there should be an international authority that controls all dangerous atomic activities. The Soviet Union disagreed with this proposal and rejected it. The Soviets' proposal involved universal nuclear disarmament. Both the American and Soviet proposals were refused by the UN.

Some experimental scientists who worked directly with radioactive materials in this period may have been victims of radiation poisoning, often dying prematurely in the 1950s. These include Enrico Fermi, Igor Kurchatov, and Frédéric Joliot-Curie.

== Early Cold War ==
=== Warhead development ===
In the years immediately after the Second World War, the United States had a monopoly on specific knowledge of and raw materials for nuclear weaponry. American leaders hoped that their exclusive ownership of nuclear weapons would be enough to draw concessions from the Soviet Union, but this proved ineffective.

Just six months after the UN General Assembly, the United States conducted its first post-war nuclear tests — Operation Crossroads. The purpose of this operation was to test the effect of nuclear explosions on ships. These tests were performed at Bikini Atoll in the Pacific on 95 ships, including German and Japanese ships that were captured during World War II. One plutonium implosion-type bomb was detonated over the fleet, while the other one was detonated underwater.

In secrecy, the Soviet government was working on building its own atomic weapons. During the war, Soviet efforts had been limited by a lack of uranium, but new supplies discovered in Eastern Europe provided a steady supply while the Soviets developed a domestic source. While American experts had predicted that the Soviet Union would not have nuclear weapons until the mid-1950s, the first Soviet bomb was detonated on August 29, 1949. The bomb, named "First Lightning" by the West, was more or less a copy of "Fat Man", one of the bombs the United States had dropped on Japan in 1945.

Both governments spent massive amounts to increase the quality and quantity of their nuclear arsenals. Both nations quickly began the development of thermonuclear weapons, which can achieve vastly greater explosive yields. The United States detonated the first hydrogen bomb on November 1, 1952, on Enewetak, an atoll in the Pacific Ocean. Code-named "Ivy Mike", the project was led by Edward Teller, a Hungarian-American nuclear physicist. It created a cloud 100 miles (160 km) wide and 25 miles (40 km) high, killing all life on the surrounding islands. Again, the Soviets surprised the world by exploding a deployable thermonuclear device in August 1953, although it was not a true multi-stage hydrogen bomb. However, it was small enough to be dropped from an airplane, making it ready for use. The development of these two Soviet bombs was greatly aided by the Russian spies Harry Gold and Klaus Fuchs.

On March 1, 1954, the U.S. conducted the Castle Bravo test, which tested another hydrogen bomb on Bikini Atoll. Scientists significantly underestimated the size of the bomb, thinking it would yield 5 megatons. However, it yielded 14.8 megatons, the highest yield ever achieved by an American nuclear device. The explosion was so large the nuclear fallout exposed residents up to 300 miles (480 km) away to significant amounts of radiation. They were eventually evacuated, but most experienced radiation poisoning; and one person was killed, a crew member on a Japanese fishing boat which was 90 miles (140 km) from the bomb test site when the explosion occurred.

The Soviet Union detonated its first "true" hydrogen bomb on November 22, 1955, which had a yield of 1.6 megatons. On October 30, 1961, the Soviets detonated a hydrogen bomb with a yield of approximately 58 megatons.

With both sides in the Cold War having nuclear capability, an arms race developed, with the Soviet Union attempting first to catch up and then to surpass the Americans.

=== Delivery vehicles ===
Strategic bombers were the primary delivery method at the beginning of the Cold War.

Missiles had long been regarded the ideal platform for nuclear weapons and were potentially a more effective delivery system than bombers. Starting in the 1950s, medium-range ballistic missiles and intermediate-range ballistic missiles ("IRBM"s) were developed for delivery of tactical nuclear weapons, and the technology developed to the progressively longer ranges, eventually becoming intercontinental ballistic missiles (ICBMs). On October 4, 1957, the Soviet Union launched the first artificial satellite, Sputnik 1, into an orbit around the Earth, demonstrating that Soviet ICBMs were capable of reaching any point on the planet. The United States launched its first satellite, Explorer 1, on January 31, 1958.

Meanwhile, submarine-launched ballistic missiles were also developed. By the mid-1960s, the "triad" of nuclear weapon delivery was established, with each side deploying bombers, ICBMs, and SLBMs, in order to ensure that even if a defense was found against one delivery method, the other methods would still be available.

Some in the United States during the early 1960s pointed out that although all of the individual components of nuclear missiles had been tested separately (warheads, navigation systems, rockets), it was infeasible to test them all combined. Critics charged that it was not really known how a warhead would react to the gravity forces and temperature differences encountered in the upper atmosphere and outer space, and Kennedy was unwilling to run a test of an ICBM with a live warhead. The closest event to an actual test was 1962's Operation Frigate Bird, in which the submarine USS Ethan Allen (SSBN-608) launched a Polaris A2 missile over 1,000 miles (1,600 km) to the nuclear test site at Christmas Island. It was challenged by, among others, Curtis LeMay, who put missile accuracy into doubt to encourage the development of new bombers. Other critics pointed out that it was a single test which could be an anomaly; that it was a lower-altitude SLBM and therefore was subject to different conditions than an ICBM; and that significant modifications had been made to its warhead before testing.

Intercontinental Ballistic Missiles (ICBMs), warheads and throw-weights of United States and Soviet Union, 1964–1982
Year	Launchers		Warheads		Megatonnage	
Year	United States	Soviet Union	United States	Soviet Union	United States	Soviet Union
1964	2,416	375	6,800	500	7,500	1,000
1966	2,396	435	5,000	550	5,600	1,200
1968	2,360	1,045	4,500	850	5,100	2,300
1970	2,230	1,680	3,900	1,800	4,300	3,100
1972	2,230	2,090	5,800	2,100	4,100	4,000
1974	2,180	2,380	8,400	2,400	3,800	4,200
1976	2,100	2,390	9,400	3,200	3,700	4,500
1978	2,058	2,350	9,800	5,200	3,800	5,400
1980	2,042	2,490	10,000	7,200	4,000	6,200
1982	2,032	2,490	11,000	10,000	4,100	8,200

=== Mutual assured destruction (MAD) ===
By the mid-1960s both the United States and the Soviet Union had enough nuclear power to obliterate their opponent. Both sides developed a capability to launch a devastating attack even after sustaining a full assault from the other side (especially by means of submarines), called a second strike. This policy became known as Mutual Assured Destruction: both sides knew that any attack upon the other would be devastating to themselves, thus in theory restraining them from attacking the other.

Both Soviet and American experts hoped to use nuclear weapons for extracting concessions from the other, or from other powers such as China, but the risk connected with using these weapons was so grave that they refrained from what John Foster Dulles referred to as brinkmanship. While some, like General Douglas MacArthur, argued nuclear weapons should be used during the Korean War, both Truman and Eisenhower opposed the idea.

Both sides were unaware of the details of the capacity of the enemy's arsenal of nuclear weapons. The Americans suffered from a lack of confidence, and in the 1950s they believed in a non-existing bomber gap. Aerial photography later revealed that the Soviets had been playing a sort of Potemkin village game with their bombers in their military parades, flying them in large circles, making it appear they had far more than they truly did. The 1960 American presidential election saw accusations of a wholly spurious missile gap between the Soviets and the Americans. On the other side, the Soviet government exaggerated the power of Soviet weapons to the leadership and Soviet first secretary Nikita Khrushchev.

== Initial nuclear proliferation ==
In addition to the United States and the Soviet Union, three other nations, the United Kingdom, the People's Republic of China, and France developed nuclear weapons during the early cold war years.

In 1952, the United Kingdom became the third nation to test a nuclear weapon when it detonated an atomic bomb in Operation Hurricane on October 3, 1952, which had a yield of 25 kilotons. Despite major contributions to the Manhattan Project by both Canadian and British governments, the U.S. Congress passed the Atomic Energy Act of 1946, which prohibited multi-national cooperation on nuclear projects. The Atomic Energy Act fueled resentment from British scientists and Winston Churchill, as they believed that there were agreements regarding post-war sharing of nuclear technology and led to Britain's developing its nuclear weapons. Britain did not begin planning the development of its nuclear weapon until January 1947. Because of Britain's small size, they decided to test their bomb on the Montebello Islands, off the coast of Australia. Following this successful test, under the leadership of Churchill, Britain decided to develop and test a hydrogen bomb. The first successful hydrogen bomb test occurred on November 8, 1957, which had a yield of 1.8 megatons. An amendment to the Atomic Energy Act in 1958 allowed nuclear cooperation once again, and British-U.S. nuclear programs resumed. During the Cold War, British nuclear deterrence came from submarines and nuclear-armed aircraft. The Resolution-class ballistic missile submarines armed with the American-built Polaris missile provided the sea deterrent, while aircraft such as the Avro Vulcan, SEPECAT Jaguar, Panavia Tornado and several other Royal Air Force strike aircraft carrying the WE.177 gravity bomb provided the air deterrent.

France became the fourth nation to possess nuclear weapons on February 13, 1960, when the atomic bomb "Gerboise Bleue" was detonated in Algeria, then still a French colony (formally a part of Metropolitan France). France began making plans for a nuclear-weapons program shortly after the Second World War, but the program did not begin until the late 1950s. Eight years later, France conducted its first thermonuclear test above Fangatuafa Atoll. It had a yield of 2.6 megatons. This bomb significantly contaminated the atoll with radiation for six years, making it off-limits to humans. During the Cold War, the French nuclear deterrent was centered around the Force de frappe, a nuclear triad consisting of Dassault Mirage IV bombers carrying such nuclear weapons as the AN-22 gravity bomb and the ASMP stand-off attack missile, Pluton and Hades ballistic missiles, and the Redoutable-class submarine armed with strategic nuclear missiles.

The People's Republic of China became the fifth nuclear power on October 16, 1964, when it detonated a 25 kiloton uranium-235 bomb in a test codenamed 596 at Lop Nur. In the late 1950s, China began developing nuclear weapons with substantial Soviet assistance in exchange for uranium ore. However, the Sino-Soviet ideological split in the late 1950s developed problems between China and the Soviet Union. This caused the Soviets to cease helping China develop nuclear weapons. However, China continued developing nuclear weapons without Soviet support and made remarkable progress in the 1960s. Owing to Soviet/Chinese tensions, the Chinese might have used nuclear weapons against either the United States or the Soviet Union in the event of a nuclear war between the United States and the Soviet Union. During the Cold War, the Chinese nuclear deterrent consisted of gravity bombs carried aboard H-6 bomber aircraft, missile systems such as the DF-2, DF-3, and DF-4, and in the later stages of the Cold War, the Type 092 ballistic missile submarine. On June 14, 1967, China detonated its first hydrogen bomb.

== Cuban Missile Crisis ==
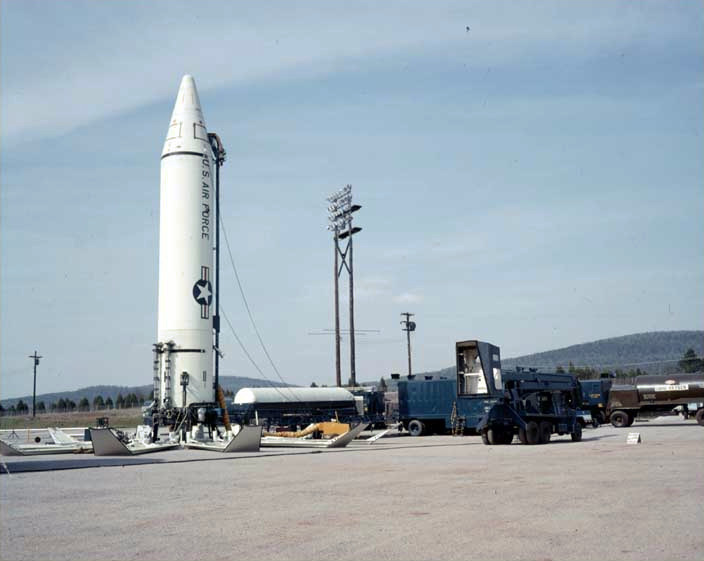
More than 100 US-built missiles having the capability to strike Moscow with nuclear warheads were deployed in Italy and Turkey in 1961.

On January 1, 1959, the Cuban government fell to communist revolutionaries, propelling Fidel Castro into power. The communist Soviet Union supported and praised Castro and his resistance, and the revolutionary government was recognized by the Soviet Union on January 10. When the United States began boycotting Cuban sugar, the Soviet Union began purchasing large quantities to support the Cuban economy in return for fuel and eventually placing nuclear ballistic missiles on Cuban soil. These missiles would be capable of reaching the United States very quickly. On October 14, 1962, an American spy plane discovered these nuclear missile sites under construction in Cuba.

President Kennedy immediately called a series of meetings for a small group of senior officials to debate the crisis. The group was split between a militaristic solution and a diplomatic one. President Kennedy ordered a naval blockade around Cuba and all military forces to DEFCON 3. As tensions increased, Kennedy eventually ordered U.S. military forces to DEFCON 2. This is considered the closest the world has been to a nuclear war. While the U.S. military had been ordered to DEFCON 2, the theory of mutually assured destruction suggests that entry into nuclear war is an unlikely possibility. While the public perceived the Cuban Missile Crisis as a time of near mass destruction, the leaders of the United States and the Soviet Union were working confidentially in order to allow the crisis to come to a peaceful conclusion. Soviet First Secretary Khrushchev wrote to President Kennedy in a telegram on October 26, 1962, saying that, "Consequently, if there is no intention to tighten that knot and thereby to doom the world to the catastrophe of thermonuclear war, then let us not only relax the forces pulling on the ends of the rope, let us take measures to untie that knot."

Eventually, on October 28, through much discussion between U.S. and Soviet officials, Khrushchev announced that the Soviet Union would withdraw all missiles from Cuba. Shortly afterwards, the U.S. withdrew all their nuclear missiles from Turkey in secret – the presence of the missiles having threatened the Soviets. Information that the U.S. had withdrawn their Jupiter Missiles from Turkey remained confidential for decades, causing the result of the negotiations between the two nations to appear to the world as a major U.S. victory. This ultimately led to the downfall of Soviet leader Khrushchev.

== Détente ==
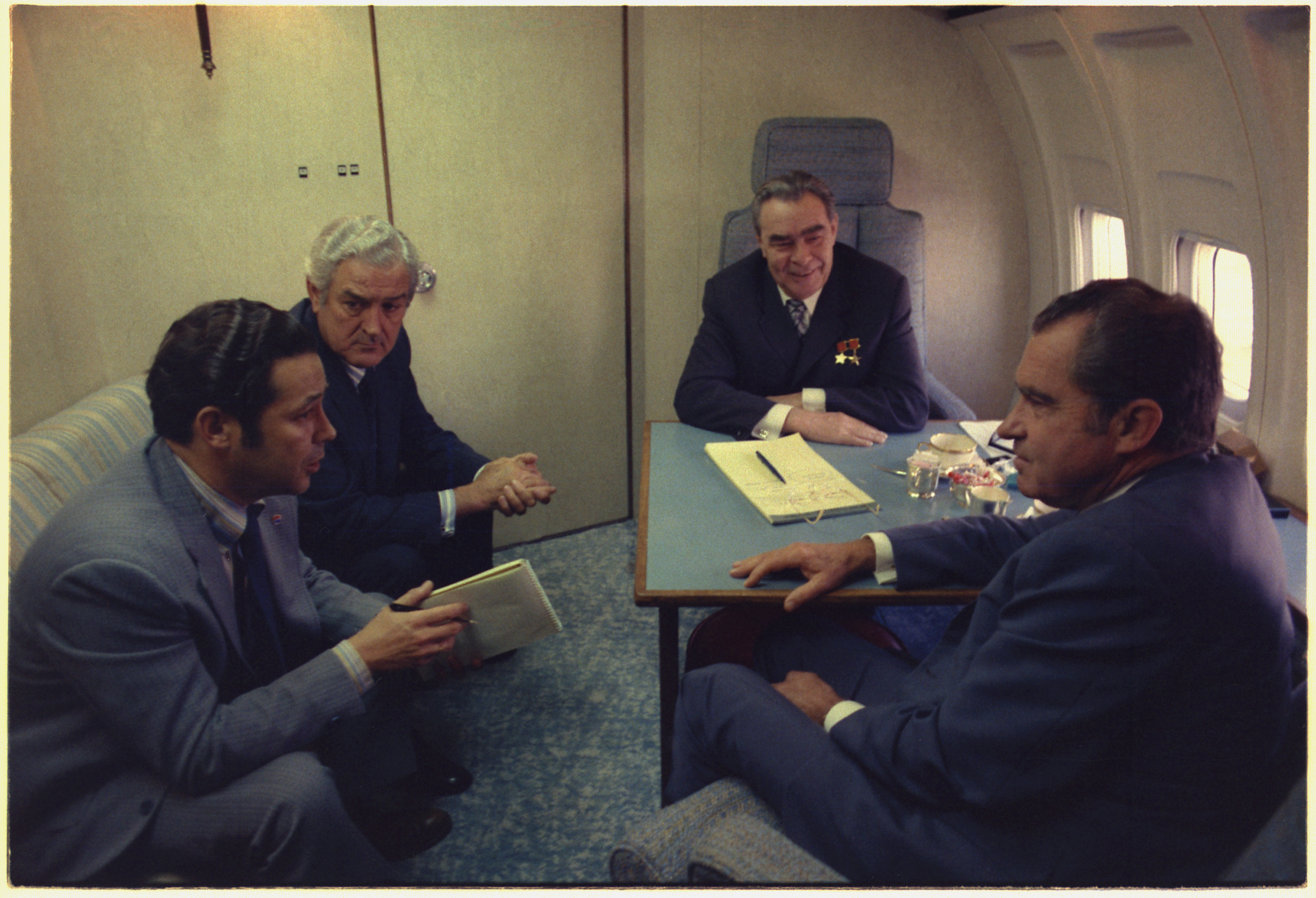
U.S. President Richard Nixon with Soviet General Secretary Leonid Brezhnev, 1973

By the 1970s, with the Cold War's entering its 30th year with no direct conflict between the United States and the Soviet Union, the superpowers entered a period of reduced conflict, in which the two powers engaged in trade and exchanges with each other. This period was known as détente.

This period included negotiation of a number of arms control agreements, building with the Nuclear Test Ban Treaty in the 1960s, but with significant new treaties negotiated in the 1970s. These treaties were only partially successful. Although both states continued to hold massive numbers of nuclear weapons and research more effective technology, the growth in number of warheads was first limited, and later, with the START I, reversed.

On 8 August 1974, the Central Intelligence Agency's Project Azorian obtained Soviet nuclear weapons in the form of nuclear torpedoes, from the sunken wreck of the Soviet submarine K-129 (1960). However, the raising ship Glomar Explorer lost the submarine's section containing the R-13 ballistic missiles and nuclear warheads, and codebooks and decoding machines.

=== Treaties ===
In 1958, both the U.S. and Soviet Union informally agreed to suspend nuclear testing. However, this agreement was ended when the Soviets resumed testing in 1961, followed by a series of nuclear tests conducted by the U.S. These events led to much political fallout, as well as the Cuban Missile Crisis in 1962. It was felt by American and Soviet leaders that something had to be done to ease the significant tensions between these two countries, so on October 10, 1963, the Limited Test Ban Treaty (LTBT) was signed. This was an agreement between the U.S., the Soviet Union, and the U.K., which significantly restricted nuclear testing. All atmospheric, underwater, and outer space nuclear testing were agreed to be halted, but testing was still allowed underground. An additional 113 countries have signed this treaty since 1963.

SALT I and SALT II limited the size of the U.S. arsenal. Bans on nuclear testing, anti-ballistic missile systems, and weapons in space all attempted to limit the expansion of the arms race through the Partial Test Ban Treaty.

In November 1969, Strategic Arms Limitation Talks (SALT) begun. This was primarily due to the economic impact that nuclear testing and production had on both U.S. and Soviet economies. The SALT I Treaty, which was signed in May 1972, produced an agreement on two significant documents. These were the Anti-Ballistic Missile Treaty (ABM Treaty) and the Interim Agreement on the Limitation of Strategic Offensive Arms. The ABM treaty limited each country to two ABM sites, while the Interim Agreement froze each country's number of intercontinental ballistic missiles (ICBMs) and submarine-launched ballistic missiles (SLBMs) at current levels for five years. This treaty significantly reduced nuclear-related costs as well as the risk of nuclear war. However, SALT I failed to address how many nuclear warheads could be placed on a single missile. A new technology, known as multiple-independently targetable re-entry vehicle (MIRV), allowed single missiles to hold and launch multiple nuclear missiles at targets while in mid-air. Over the next 10 years, the Soviet Union and U.S. added 12,000 nuclear warheads to their already built arsenals.

Throughout the 1970s, both the Soviet Union and United States replaced older warheads and missiles with newer, more powerful and effective ones. On June 18, 1979, the SALT II treaty was signed in Vienna. This treaty limited both sides' nuclear arsenals and technology. However, in light of the Soviet Union's invasion of Afghanistan in December 1979, the United States Senate never ratified the SALT II treaty. This ended the treaty negotiations as well as the era of détente.

== Reagan and the Strategic Defense Initiative ==
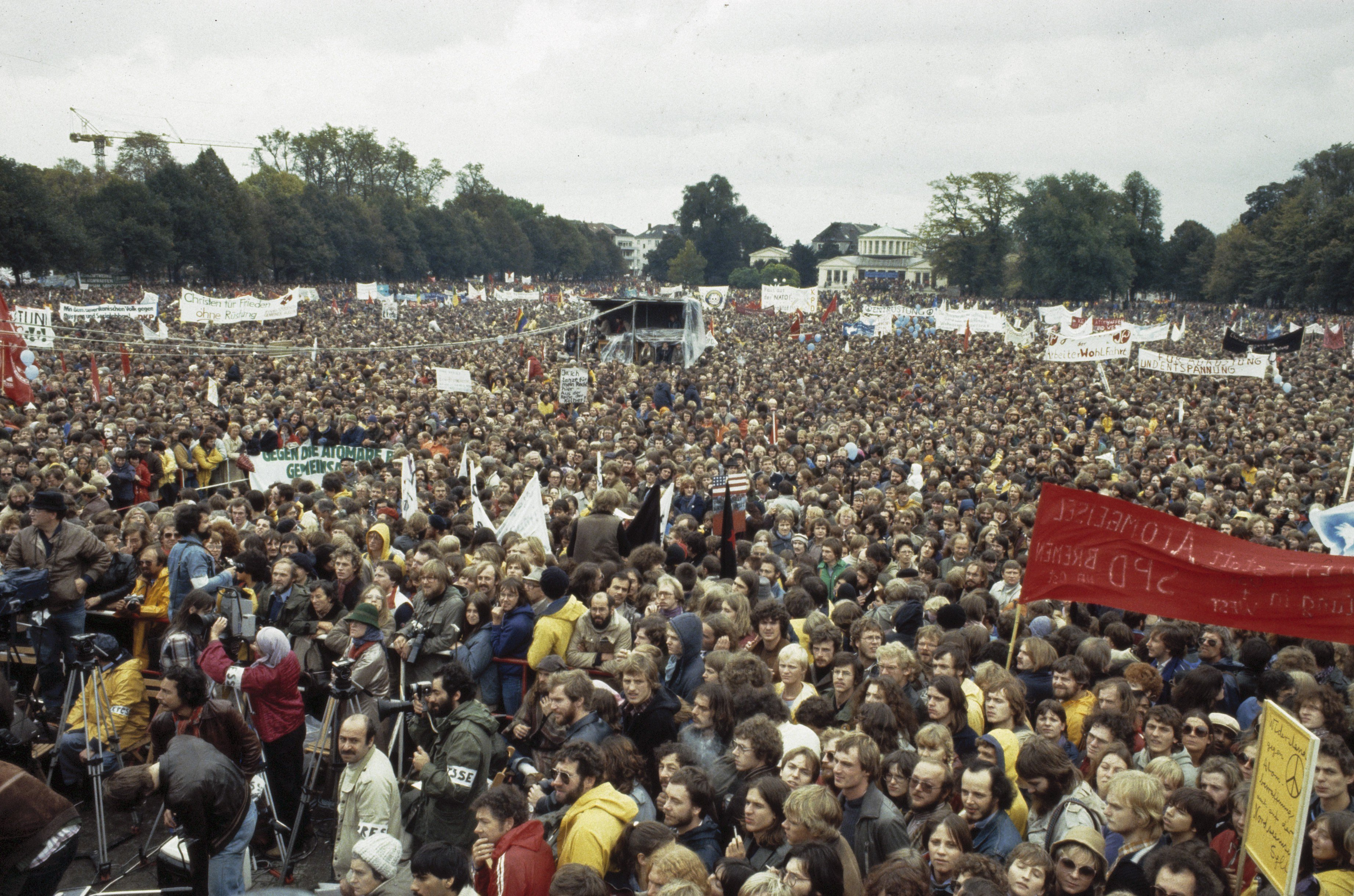
Protest in Bonn, West Germany against the nuclear arms race between the U.S./NATO and the Soviet Union, 1981

Despite détente, both sides continued to develop and introduce not only more accurate weapons, but weapons with more warheads ("MIRVs"). The presidency of Ronald Reagan proposed a missile defense programme tagged the Strategic Defense Initiative, a space-based anti-ballistic missile system derided as "Star Wars" by its critics; simultaneously, missile defense was also being researched in the Soviet Union. However, the SDI would require technology that had not yet been developed, or even researched. This system proposed both space- and earth-based laser battle stations. It would also need sensors on the ground, in the air, and in space with radar, optical, and infrared technology to detect incoming missiles. Simultaneously, however, Reagan initiated negotiations with Mikhail Gorbachev, ultimately resulting in the Strategic Arms Reduction Treaty on reducing nuclear stockpiles.

Owing to high costs and complex technology for its time, the scope of the SDI project was reduced from defense against a massive attack to a system for defending against limited attacks, transitioning into the Ballistic Missile Defense Organization.

== The end of the Cold War ==
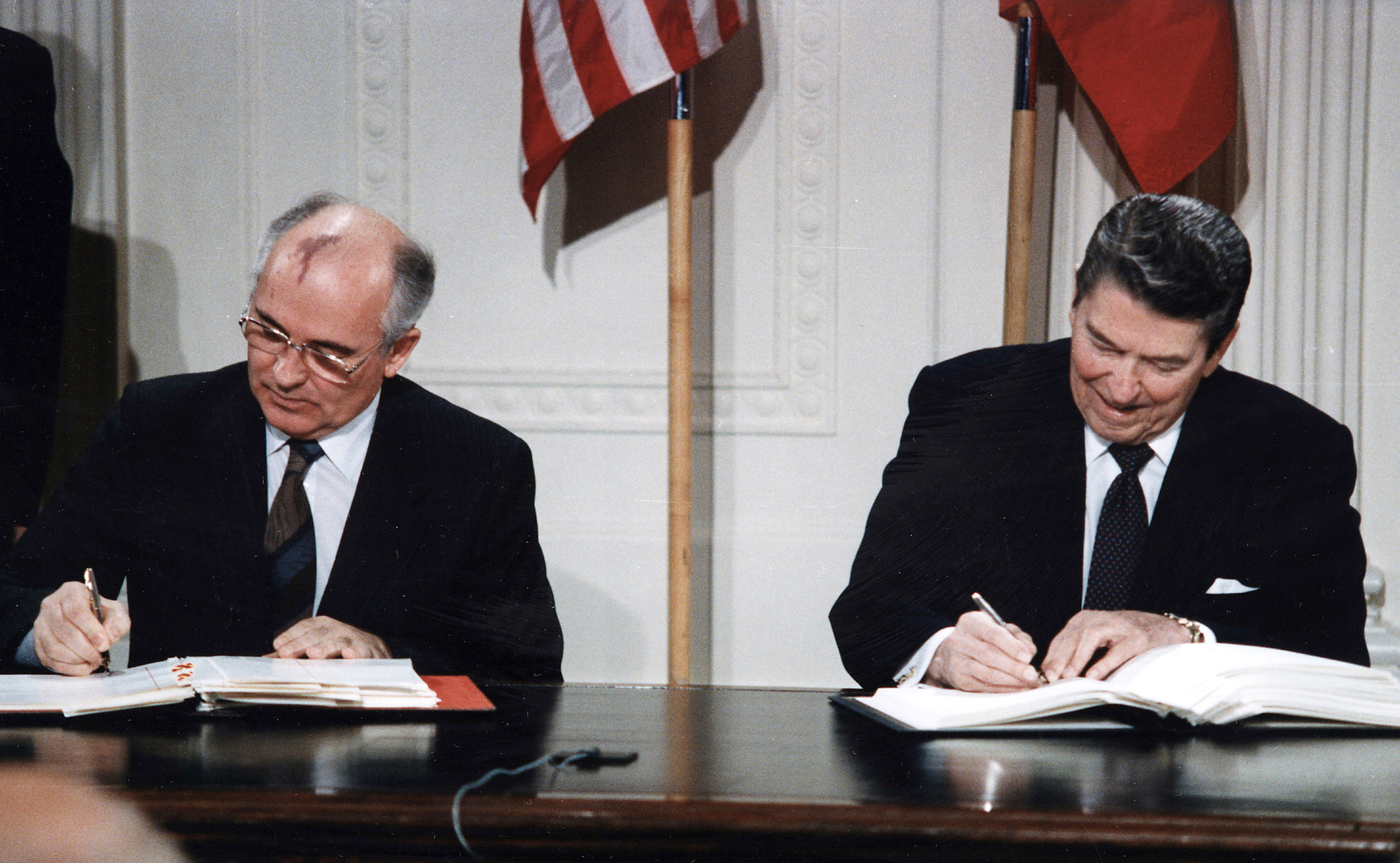
Soviet General Secretary Gorbachev and U.S. President Reagan signing the INF Treaty, 1987

During the mid-1980s, the U.S-Soviet relations significantly improved, Mikhail Gorbachev assumed control of the Soviet Union after the deaths of several former Soviet leaders and announced a new era of "perestroika" and "glasnost," meaning restructuring and openness respectively. Gorbachev proposed a 50% reduction of nuclear weapons for both the U.S. and Soviet Union at the meeting in Reykjavik, Iceland in October 1986. However, the proposal was refused due to disagreements over Reagan's SDI. Instead, the Intermediate Nuclear Forces (INF) Treaty was signed on December 8, 1987, in Washington, which eliminated an entire class of nuclear weapons.

In July 1991, the START (Strategic Arms Reduction Treaty) was negotiated between the U. S. and the Soviet Union, to reduce the number and limit the capabilities of limitation of strategic offensive arms. This was eventually succeeded by the START II, START III, and New START treaties.

Owing to the dramatic economic and social changes occurring within the Soviet Union, many of its constituent republics began to declare their independence. With the wave of revolutions sweeping across Eastern-Europe, the Soviet Union was unable to impose its will on its satellite states and so its sphere of influence slowly diminished. By December 16, 1991, all of the republics had declared independence from the Union. The Soviet leader, Mikhail Gorbachev resigned as the country's president on December 25 and the Soviet Union was declared non-existent the following day.

== Post–Cold War ==
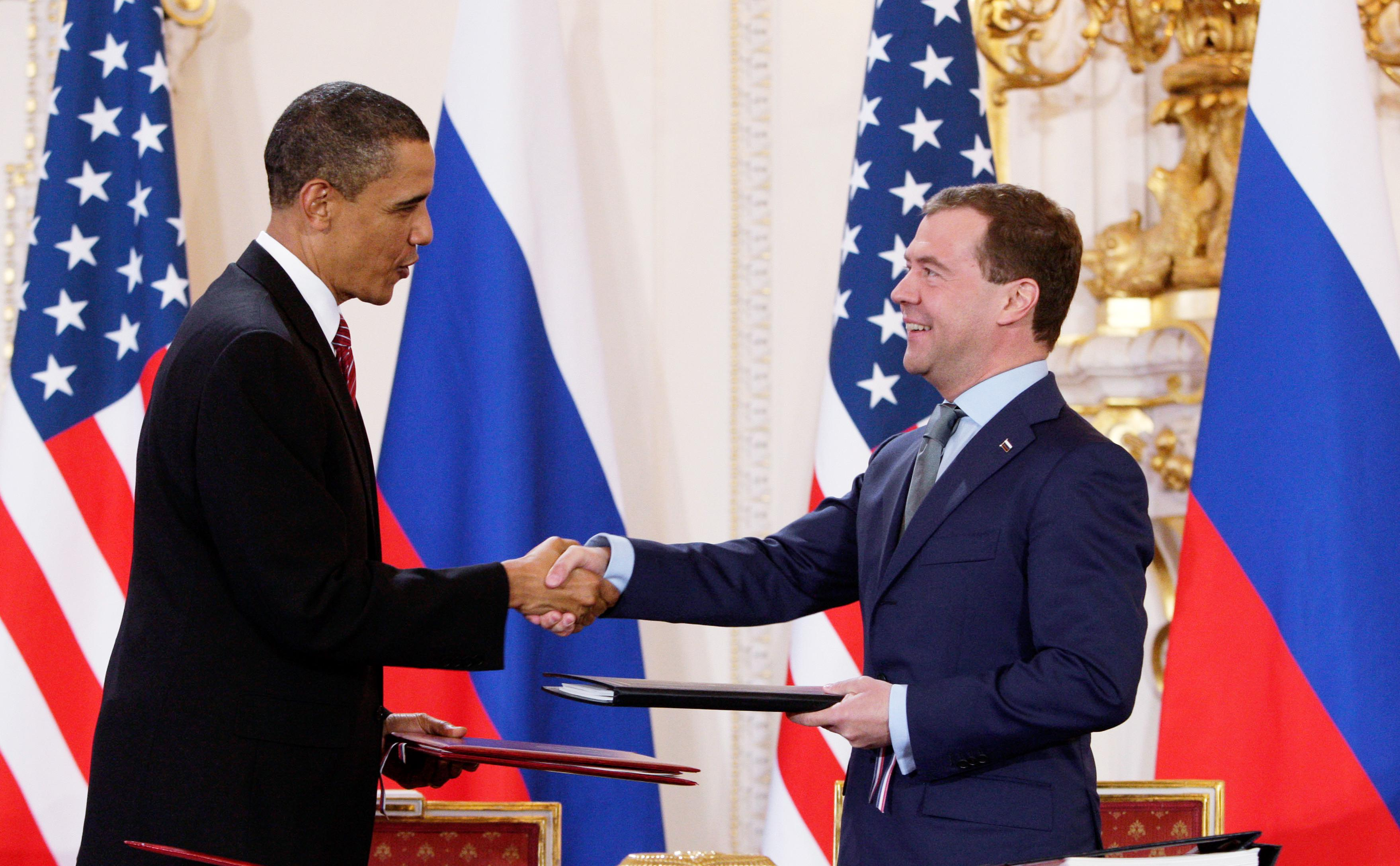
Dmitry Medvedev with Barack Obama after signing the New START treaty in Prague, 2010

With the end of the Cold War, the United States and Russia cut down on nuclear weapons spending. Fewer new systems were developed, and both arsenals were reduced, although both countries maintain significant stocks of nuclear missiles. In the United States, stockpile stewardship programs have taken over the role of maintaining the aging arsenal.

After the Cold War ended, large inventories of nuclear weapons and facilities remained. Some are being recycled, dismantled, or recovered as valuable substances. Large amounts of money and resources – which would have been spent on developing nuclear weapons in the Soviet Union, had the arms race continued – were instead used for repairing the environmental damage produced by the nuclear arms race, and almost all former production sites are now major cleanup sites. In the United States, the plutonium production facility at Hanford, Washington, and the plutonium pit fabrication facility at Rocky Flats, Colorado, are among the most polluted sites.

Military policies and strategies have been modified to reflect the increasing intervals without major confrontation. In 1995, United States policy and strategy regarding nuclear proliferation was outlined in the document "Essentials of Post–Cold War Deterrence", produced by the Policy Subcommittee of the Strategic Advisory Group (SAG) of the United States Strategic Command.

In 2015, the Federation of American Scientists estimated that 125,000 nuclear weapons had been produced between 1945 and 2013.

Estimated total nuclear weapons produced by country, 1945–2013
	World	(United States)	(Russia)	(United Kingdom)	(France)	(China)	(Israel)	(India)	(Pakistan)	(North Korea)
Warheads produced	125,000	66,500	55,000	1,250	1,260	610	80	100–120	90–110	0
Warhead count in 2013	17,200	7,700	8,500	225	300	250	80	100–120	90–110	0 (Note: The Federation of American Scientists pointed to the United States Intelligence Community 2013 assessment that despite three nuclear tests North Korea had not demonstrated an operationalized weapon i.e. warhead.)

=== 21st century nuclear arms race ===
On December 13, 2001, George W. Bush gave Russia notice of the United States' withdrawal from the Anti-Ballistic Missile Treaty. This led to the eventual creation of the American Missile Defense Agency. Russian President Vladimir Putin responded to the withdrawal by ordering a build-up of Russia's nuclear capabilities, designed to counterbalance U.S. capabilities.

On April 8, 2010, U.S. President Barack Obama and Russian President Dmitry Medvedev signed the New START Treaty, which called for a fifty percent reduction of strategic nuclear missile launchers and a curtailment of deployed nuclear warheads. The U.S. Senate ratified the treaty in December 2010 by a three-quarter majority.

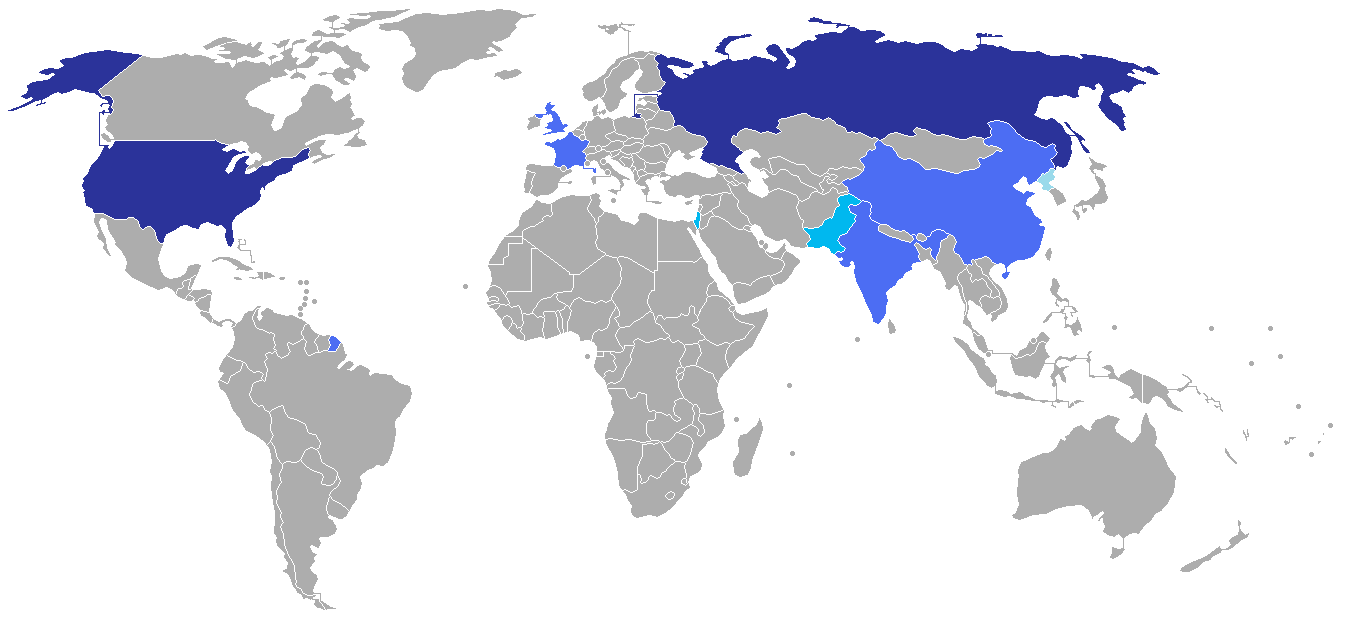
Large stockpile with global range (dark blue), smaller stockpile with global range (medium blue), small stockpile with regional range (light blue)

On December 22, 2016, U.S. President Donald Trump proclaimed in a tweet that "the United States must greatly strengthen and expand its nuclear capability until such time as the world comes to its senses regarding nukes," effectively challenging the world to re-engage in a race for nuclear dominance. The next day, Trump reiterated his position to Morning Joe host Mika Brzezinski of MSNBC, stating: "Let it be an arms race. We will outmatch them at every pass and outlast them all."

In October 2018, the former Soviet leader Mikhail Gorbachev commented that U.S. withdrawal from the INF nuclear treaty is "not the work of a great mind" and that "a new arms race has been announced".

In 2019, Russian Deputy Foreign Minister Sergey Ryabkov warned about the risk of nuclear war, as negative dynamics had been noticeable over the previous year. He urged the nuclear states to build channels on forestalling potential incidents in order to lower the risks.

According to a peer-reviewed study published in the journal Nature Food in August 2022, a full-scale nuclear war between the United States and Russia, which together hold more than 90% of the world's nuclear weapons, would kill 360 million people directly and more than 5 billion (80% of humanity) indirectly by starvation during a nuclear winter. Roughly 99% of the people in the US, Europe, Russia and China would starve to death if they did not die of something else sooner with 95% of the fatalities being in countries not initially involved.

On February 21, 2023, Russian President Vladimir Putin suspended Russia's participation in the New START nuclear arms reduction treaty with the United States, saying that Russia would not allow the US and NATO to inspect its nuclear facilities.

In July 2024, the Biden administration announced its intention to deploy long-range missiles in Germany starting in 2026 that could hit Russian territory within 10 minutes. In response, Russian President Putin warned of a Cold War-style missile crisis and threatened to deploy long-range missiles within striking distance of the West. US weapons in Germany would include SM-6 and Tomahawk cruise missiles and hypersonic weapons. The United States' decision to deploy long-range missiles in Germany has been compared to the deployment of Pershing II launchers in Western Europe in 1979. Critics say the move would trigger a new arms race. According to Russian military analysts, it would be extremely difficult to distinguish between a conventionally armed missile and a missile carrying a nuclear warhead, and Russia could respond by deploying longer-range nuclear systems targeting Germany.

In August 2024, The Economist reported that "a new nuclear arms race draws closer", as the U.S. is considering increasing its nuclear forces in response to escalating threats and rapid nuclear expansions by China and Russia, as well as North Korea's advancements in missile technology and Iran's advancement as a "threshold" nuclear state.

On October 29, 2025, Trump tweeted on Truth Social that he had instructed the Department of War to immediately begin testing nuclear weapons on par with Russia and China.

== India and Pakistan ==
In South Asia, India and Pakistan have also engaged in a technological nuclear arms race since the 1970s. The nuclear competition started in 1974 with India detonating a device, codenamed Smiling Buddha, at the Pokhran region of the Rajasthan state. The Indian government called this test a "peaceful nuclear explosion", but according to independent sources, it was actually part of an accelerated covert nuclear program of India.

This test generated great concern and doubts in Pakistan, with fear it would be at the mercy of its long-time arch-rival. Pakistan had its own covert atomic bomb projects in 1972 which ran for many years since the first Indian weapon was detonated. After the 1974 test, the pace of Pakistan's atomic bomb program significantly accelerated, culminating in successfully building its own atomic weapons. In the last few decades of the 20th century, India and Pakistan began to develop nuclear-capable rockets and nuclear military technologies. Finally, in 1998, India – under Atal Bihari Vajpayee's government – test detonated five more nuclear weapons. Domestic pressure within Pakistan began to build and Prime Minister Nawaz Sharif ordered a test, detonating six nuclear weapons (Chagai-I and Chagai-II) in retaliation and to act as a deterrent.

According to a peer-reviewed study published in the journal Nature Food in August 2022, a nuclear war between India and Pakistan could kill more than 2 billion indirectly by starvation during a nuclear winter.

According to the U.S. Defense Intelligence Agency's 2025 Worldwide Threat Assessment, it was estimated that Pakistan's nuclear stockpile could grow to a total of 200 warheads in 2025, a sharp rise from an estimated 60-80 warheads in 1999. The report attributed this growth to Pakistan's view of India as an existential threat and its strategy to counter India's conventional superiority through tactical nuclear weapons.

== Defense against nuclear attacks ==
From the beginning of the Cold War, The United States, Russia, and other nations have all attempted to develop anti-ballistic missiles. The United States developed the LIM-49 Nike Zeus in the 1950s in order to destroy incoming ICBMs.

Russia has also developed ABM missiles, in the form of the A-35 anti-ballistic missile system and the later A-135 anti-ballistic missile system. Chinese state media has also announced that China has tested anti-ballistic missiles, though specific information is not public.

In November 2006, India – with an initiative called the Indian Ballistic Missile Defence Programme – successfully tested its Prithvi Air Defense (PAD) anti-ballistic missile, followed by testing of the Advanced Air Defense (AAD) anti-ballistic missile in December 2007.

== Nuclear disarmament ==
UN vote on adoption of the Treaty on the Prohibition of Nuclear Weapons on July 7, 2017 Yes No Did not vote

Nuclear disarmament is one of four different norms in the aid of getting rid of nuclear weapons. This norm can include arms control, arms reduction to elimination, prohibition, and stigmatization.

This has been a hard norm to implement. Most of the conditions, the weight, strategy, timing, conditionality, and compliance have been contested.

First the United States announced on September 27, 1991, that they would be destroying the ground-launched short-range nuclear weapons. Mikhail Gorbachev, who was the President of the Soviet Union at that time, removed nuclear warheads from air defense missiles and nuclear artillery munitions.

In 2017, the Prohibition of Nuclear Weapons Treaty gives the representation of self-empowerment. This treaty did not involve the states or their allies that had nuclear weapons.

A lot of debate has occurred about nuclear disarmament. Debates over treaties in reducing and getting rid of nuclear weapons all together have been ongoing since the Cold War ended.

In 2010, there was a debate over the New Strategic Arms Reduction (START) treaty. This treaty was negotiated between the United States and Russia.

Since this has been an ongoing endeavor, a lot of the non-nuclear states are fighting to get the states that do have nuclear weapons to abide by what they believe to be the most recent obligations.

Both the United States and Russian Presidents agreed to destroy nuclear weapons they contained.

== See also ==
- Arms race
- Nuclear warfare
- Nuclear holocaust
- Nuclear terrorism
- Space Race
- Artificial intelligence arms race
- Cold War
- Essentials of Post–Cold War Deterrence
- Deterrence theory
- Nuclear disarmament
- Historical nuclear weapons stockpiles and nuclear tests by country
- Brinkmanship (Cold War)
- Robert McNamara as Secretary of Defense § Nuclear strategy
