= Start Treaty =

Start Treaty may refer to:

- START I, a bilateral treaty between the United States of America and the Union of Soviet Socialist Republics (USSR) signed on 31 July 1991.
- New START, a bilateral treaty between the United States and the Russian Federation signed on 8 April 2010 and suspended on 21 February 2023.
