= New Start =

New Start may refer to:

- New START, a 2010 nuclear arms treaty between Russia and the U.S.
- New Start (Fastlane album), 2005
- New Start, album by the Nadas, 1997
- New Start, an album by Will Z., 2015
- New Start (Hungary), a political party in Hungary

== See also ==
- A New Start (disambiguation)
