= A New Start =

A New Start may refer to:

- "A New Start" (Arrested Development), a 2013 TV episode
- "A New Start" (Degrassi High), a 1989 TV episode
- "A New Start", a 2005 song by Fastlane from New Start

== See also ==
- New Start (disambiguation)
