= Overdrive (Fastlane album) =

Studio album by Fastlane
- Released: (United Kingdom) 7 May 2007
- Genre: Rock, Pop, Punk, Metal
- Length: 41:54
- Label: Punktastic Recordings (UK); Pyropit Records (JPN)
- Producer: John Mitchell

Fastlane chronology
New Start (2005)	Overdrive (2007)

Professional ratings
Review scores
Source	Rating
Kerrang	2/5 stars
Punktastic	4.5/5 stars

Overdrive is the second full-length album from Surrey based alternative rock band Fastlane. It was released in May 2007 by Punktastic Recordings.

== Track listing ==
All music is composed by Great Cynics

No.	Title	Length
1.	"Motion"	3:37
2.	"Let This Go"	4:03
3.	"Sunset At Seventeen"	4:06
4.	"The System"	3:59
5.	"Uninvited Feeling"	3:21
6.	"16 Hours"	3:28
7.	"Hear Me Out"	3:51
8.	"Walk Away"	4:13
9.	"As We Climb"	3:44
10.	"Burn Your Actions"	4:05
11.	"Enmity"	3:35
Total length:		41:54

Japanese Bonus Tracks
No.	Title	Length
12.	"Never Lost Til Now"	3:24
13.	"Play This Out"	3:51

== Personnel ==
Fastlane

- Ben Phillips – Vocals
- Matt O'Grady – Guitar
- Adam Biffen – Guitar
- Ian Maynard – Bass
- Gary Tough – Drums
