= START III =

Proposed arms control treaty between the United States and Russia

START III (Strategic Arms Reduction Treaty) was a proposed bilateral arms control treaty between the United States and Russia that was meant to reduce the deployed nuclear weapons arsenals of both countries drastically and to continue the weapons reduction efforts that had taken place in the START I and START II negotiations. The framework for negotiations of the treaty began with talks in Helsinki between US president Bill Clinton and Russian president Boris Yeltsin in 1997, although Clinton brought up the topic to Yeltsin as early as 1994. However, negotiations broke down, and the treaty was never signed.

Proposed basic elements of the treaty included:

- By December 31, 2007, coterminous with START II, the US and Russia would each deploy no more than 2,000 to 2,500 strategic nuclear warheads on intercontinental ballistic missiles, submarine-launched ballistic missiles, and heavy bombers. Russian officials stated that they were willing to consider negotiated levels as low as 1,500 strategic nuclear warheads within the context of a START III agreement.
- The US and Russia would negotiate measures relating to the transparency of strategic nuclear warhead inventories and the destruction of strategic nuclear warheads as well as other jointly agreed technical and organizational measures to promote the irreversibility of deep reductions.

The talks faced a number of obstacles. The Russian State Duma's refusal to ratify the START II treaty delayed the start of formal negotiations by more than two years after Yeltsin and Clinton completed the initial framework discussions in 1997. Ratification had been delayed because of Russia's opposition to Operation Infinite Reach, the NATO bombing of Serbia, eastward expansion of NATO, and America's plans to build a limited missile defense system (which would have required changes to or the US withdrawal from the 1972 Anti-Ballistic Missile Treaty).

Very little progress was made towards completing negotiations on START III. Attempts at negotiating START III were eventually abandoned, and the US and Russia instead agreed to the Strategic Offensive Reductions Treaty (SORT) or Moscow Treaty.

== In popular culture ==
START III plays a large role in the 1998 video game, Metal Gear Solid in which a nuclear terrorist attack is scheduled on the date of the signing of START III, which is supposed to take place at the end of February 2005.

== See also ==
- New START
- SALT I and II
