= Fastlane (band) =

- Origin: Guildford, England
- Genres: rock, pop
- Years active: 1997–2007
- Labels: Pyropit Records, Punktastic Recordings

Fastlane were an English rock band that emerged from the Surrey rock scene in 1997.

In 2002, the band reformed with a slightly different line-up: Benji singing, Matty and Biffen playing Guitar, Tom Marsden playing Bass, and Dan Ranson playing drums. During the summer of 2002, Fastlane self-released their debut EP ‘She Loves the Rock’ and was picked up by 20 Deck Records, where they were soon on the road touring and playing to audiences across the country. Another line-up change and an original member return, Ian Maynard picked up the bass as Tom left the band. Fastlane grew as they gained over 20,000 downloads on the former website MP3.com in under 12 months. 2003 found Fastlane making the final line-up change, when Gary Tough joined as the drummer. In reviews, Fastlane's genre has been listed as pop punk, emo, screamo, pop, and metal.

In March 2004, Fastlane entered the studio to record their first full-length album titled New Start with the producer Iain Wetherell, at the Premier Studios in Corby. They played shows in multiple cities in England promoting their upcoming release, and in the latter part of 2004, the album was finished. New Start included the songs, "Eyes Closed", "Elevator", "A New Start", "Million Times" and the single "Dreaming". The album was released on Suckapunch Records in the UK in 2005, and Pyropit Records in Japan later that year. It was distributed in HMV, Tower Records, Virgin Megastores, Tesco, and Amazon.

In 2005, Fastlane commenced their headline national tour even adding dates in Scotland and Wales. In addition to their headline tour, they supported other UK tours including New Found Glory, Silverstein, Gratitude, Avenged Sevenfold, Zebrahead, The Academy Is, Aiden, 4Ft Fingers, Spunge, and My Awesome Compilation.

2006 began with another headline tour for Fastlane and in addition supporting tours of bands such as Aiden, Hidden in Plain View, Funeral for a Friend, and Fightstar. During the summer, Fastlane returned to the studio to record their second album, Overdrive, with producer John Mitchell at Outhouse Studios in Reading. The album was released by Pyropit Records in Japan during October 2006, and was followed with an international tour when Fastlane flew to Tokyo promoted it. Pyropit Records, an indie record company in Japan joined forces with Kick Rock Music to create a tour for Fastlane and three American bands; The Swellers, The Space Pimps, and Better Luck Next Time. They sold out venues such as The Club Quattro and ACB in Tokyo with a capacity of 500+ people, and conducted in-stores at Tower Records in Shibuya, Tokyo.

Since MP3.com closed, Fastlane have uploaded music on both Purevolume, where they have over 26,000 plays and Myspace.com where they have over 130,000 plays. Overdrive was released on Punktastic Recordings in the UK on 7 May 2007. The band split up following its release.

== Members ==
- Ben Phillips – vocals (1997–2007)
- Matt O'Grady – lead guitar (1997–2007)
- Adam Biffen – rhythm guitar (1997–2007)
- Ian Maynard – bass, piano (1997–1999, 2002–2007)
- Gary Tough – drums (2003–2007)
- Tom Marsden – bass (1999–2002)
- Dan Ransen – drums (1999–2003)

== Discography ==
- New Start (2005) - Suckapunch Records
- New Start (2005) - Pyropit Records
- Overdrive (2006) - Pyropit Records
- Overdrive (2007) - Punktastic Recordings

== In media ==
- Fastlane have been featured in Kerrang magazine.
- Featured in Rockin'On Magazine, GrindHouse Magazine, and Crossbeat in Japan.
- Charted No. 4 Japan’s HMV Pop Punk Music Chart, No. 16 Japan’s HMV Alternative Chart, No. 283 Japan’s HMV Music Chart.
- Sold 14,000 copies of ‘New Start.’
- 6,500 pre-sales of ‘Overdrive.’
- Headlined a tour through England, Scotland, and Wales.
- Toured Japan in October 2006.
- Released two albums on notable indie label Pyropit Records in Japan.
- Won the Taste of Chaos Tour Music Competition.

== Venues ==
=== National venues played ===
- London Astoria
- Camden Barfly
- Camden Underworld
- Mean Fiddler
- The Garage
- Islington Academy
- The Sound Leicester Square
- The Verge
- Not Ku Club
- Birmingham NIA
- Birmingham Academy, Academy 2, Bar Academy
- Nottingham Rock City
- Manchester Road House
- Liverpool Academy
- Leeds Cockpit
- Newcastle University
- York Fibbers
- Southampton Guildhall
- Wolverhampton Wulfrun
- Wolverhampton Little Civic
- Oxford Zodiac
- Cambridge Junction
- Norwich Waterfront
- The Leicester Charlotte
- Bournemouth Firestation
- Tunbridge Wells Forum
- Plymouth University
- Exeter Cavern
- Middlesbrough Town Hall Crypt

=== International venues ===
- Wales:
  - Cardiff Barfly
  - Clwb Ifor Bach
  - Wrexham Central Station
- Scotland:
  - Glasgow Arches
  - Glasgow Barfly
  - Glasgow King Tuts
  - Arbroath Viewfield Hotel
  - Aberdeen Tunnels
- Japan:
  - The Club Quattro
  - ACB
  - Club Milk
  - Kumagaya’s Heavens Rock
