= Strategic Offensive Reductions Treaty =

2002 nuclear disarmament treaty between the U.S. and Russia

SORT / Treaty of Moscow
Treaty on Strategic Offensive Reductions
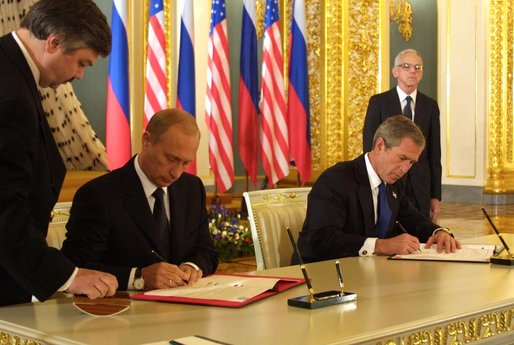
- Presidents Vladimir Putin and George W. Bush sign SORT on 24 May 2002 in Moscow
- Type: Strategic nuclear disarmament
- Signed: 24 May 2002
- Location: Moscow
- Effective: 1 June 2003
- Condition: Ratification of both parties
- Replaced by: New START
- Expired: 5 February 2011 (superseded by New START)
- Signatories: (United States) George W. Bush (Russia) Vladimir Putin
- Parties: United States; Russia
- Ratifiers: U.S. Senate; State Duma
- Languages: English, Russian

The Treaty Between the United States of America and the Russian Federation on Strategic Offensive Reductions (SORT), also known as the Treaty of Moscow, was a strategic arms reduction treaty between the United States and Russia that was in force from June 2003 until February 2011 when it was superseded by the New START treaty.

At the time, SORT was positioned as "represent[ing] an important element of the new strategic relationship" between the two countries with both parties agreeing to limit their nuclear arsenal to between 1,700 and 2,200 operationally deployed warheads each. It was signed in Moscow on 24 May 2002.

After ratification by the U.S. Senate and the State Duma, SORT came into force on 1 June 2003. It would have expired on 31 December 2012 if not superseded by New START. Either party could have withdrawn from the treaty upon giving three months written notice to the other.

== Mutual nuclear disarmament ==
SORT was one in a long line of treaties and negotiations on mutual nuclear disarmament between Russia (and its predecessor, the Soviet Union) and the United States, which includes SALT I (1969–1972), the ABM Treaty (1972), SALT II (1972–1979), the INF Treaty (1987), START I (1991), START II (1993) and New START (2010).

The Moscow Treaty was different from START in that it limited operationally deployed warheads, whereas START I limited warheads through declared attribution to their means of delivery (ICBMs, SLBMs, and Heavy Bombers).

Russian and U.S. delegations met twice a year to discuss the implementation of the Moscow Treaty at the Bilateral Implementation Commission (BIC).

== Ratification ==
The treaty was submitted for ratification in December 2002. However, the passage of the agreement took about a year because the bill had to be resubmitted after its rejection in committee due to concerns about funding for nuclear forces and about cutting systems that had not yet reached the end of their service lives. Further, the deputies were concerned about the U.S.'s ability to upload reserve nuclear warheads for a first strike (upload potential).

The ratification was also problematic because the chairman of the foreign affairs committee of the Duma, Dmitry Rogozin, disagreed with his Federation Council counterpart Margelov. Deputy Rogozin argued that the Moscow Treaty should be delayed because of the 2003 U.S. invasion of Iraq. In the end, however, this delay never happened. The final vote was similar to START II with nearly a third of the deputies voting against. The ratification resolution mandated presidential reporting on nuclear force developments and noted that key legislators should be included in interagency planning.

== Implementation ==
Lawrence Livermore National Laboratory reported that President Bush directed the US military to cut its stockpile of both deployed and reserve nuclear weapons in half by 2012. The goal was achieved in 2007, a reduction of US nuclear warheads to just over 50 percent of the 2001 total. A further proposal by Bush would have brought the total down another 15 percent.

== Criticism ==
While President Bush said the treaty "liquidates the Cold War legacy of nuclear hostility" and his security advisor Condoleezza Rice said it should be considered "the last treaty of the last century," others criticized the treaty for various reasons:

- There were no verification provisions to give confidence, to either the signatories or other parties, that the stated reductions have in fact taken place.
- The arsenal reductions were not required to be permanent; warheads are not required to be destroyed and may therefore be placed in storage and later redeployed.
- The arsenal reductions were required to be completed by 31 December 2012, which is also the day on which the treaty loses all force unless extended by both parties.
- There was a clause in the treaty which provided that withdrawal can occur upon the giving of three months' notice and since no benchmarks are required in the treaty, either side could feasibly perform no actions in furtherance of the treaty and then withdraw in September 2012.

== See also ==
- Russia and weapons of mass destruction
- United States and weapons of mass destruction
