= Sergei Ryabkov =

Deputy Foreign Minister of the Russian Federation

- Сергей Рябков
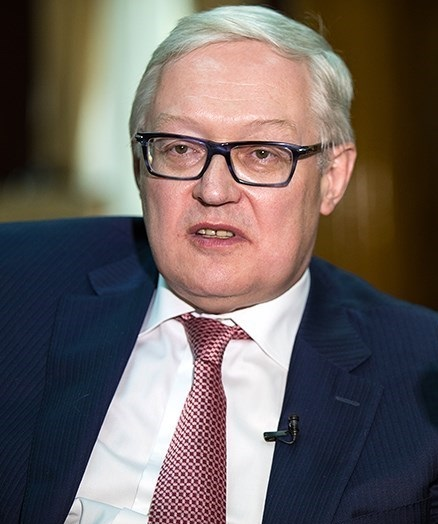
- Ryabkov in 2016

Deputy Minister of Foreign Affairs
- Incumbent
- Assumed office 15 August 2008
- Prime Minister: Vladimir Putin; Dmitry Medvedev; Mikhail Mishustin
- Minister: Sergei Lavrov

Personal details
- Born: 8 July 1960 (age 66) Leningrad, Soviet Union
- Children: 2

Sergei Alexeyevich Ryabkov (Russian: Сергей Алексеевич Рябков; born 8 July 1960) is a Russian diplomat, currently serving as the Deputy Foreign Minister of the Russian Federation since 2008.

== Early life and education ==
Ryabkov was born in Leningrad in 1960. At age 22, in 1982, he graduated from the Moscow State Institute of International Relations. Upon graduation, he immediately joined the Russian Foreign Ministry.

== Career ==
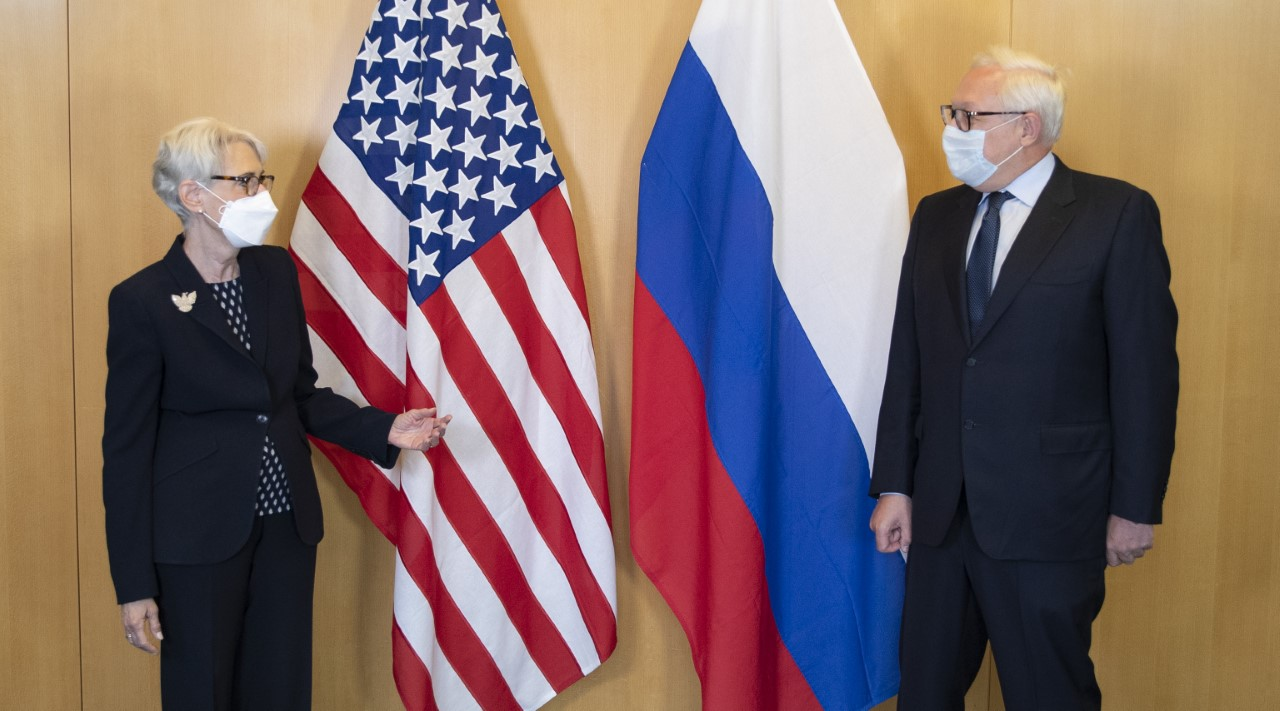
Ryabkov meets with US Deputy Secretary of State Wendy Sherman in Geneva on 28 July 2021.

In 1995, he worked in the Foreign Ministry's Department of European Co-operation. In 2002, he worked as Minister-Counselor at the Russian Embassy in Washington, DC. In 2006, he returned to Moscow and was appointed head of his former department (the Department of European Co-operation). He was designated Deputy Foreign Minister in 2008.

In January 2022 when asked about the possibility of Russian military deployment to Cuba or Venezuela, Ryabkov said "it all depends on the actions by our US counterparts".

On 28 December 2021, U.S. and Russia announced bilateral talks would take place in Geneva on 10 January 2022, to discuss concerns about their respective military activity and to confront rising tensions over Ukraine. The talks were led by Ryabkov and U.S. Deputy Secretary of State, Wendy Sherman. Ryabkov said Russia has "no intention of attacking, staging an offensive on or invading Ukraine."

In 2024, he said that Russia was considering all options when it came to nuclear testing in response to President-elect Donald Trump's position on the issue.

== Personal life ==
Ryabkov speaks English fluently and frequently gives interviews to English-speaking media organizations. Ryabkov, for example, often appears on the channel RT. He often speaks for the Foreign Ministry in commenting on nuclear and other disarmament negotiations, specifically such things as the New START treaty.

He is married and has two children.
