= START II =

1993 nuclear arms reduction treaty between the US and Russia

Strategic Arms Reduction Treaty II Договор о сокращении стратегических наступательных вооружений
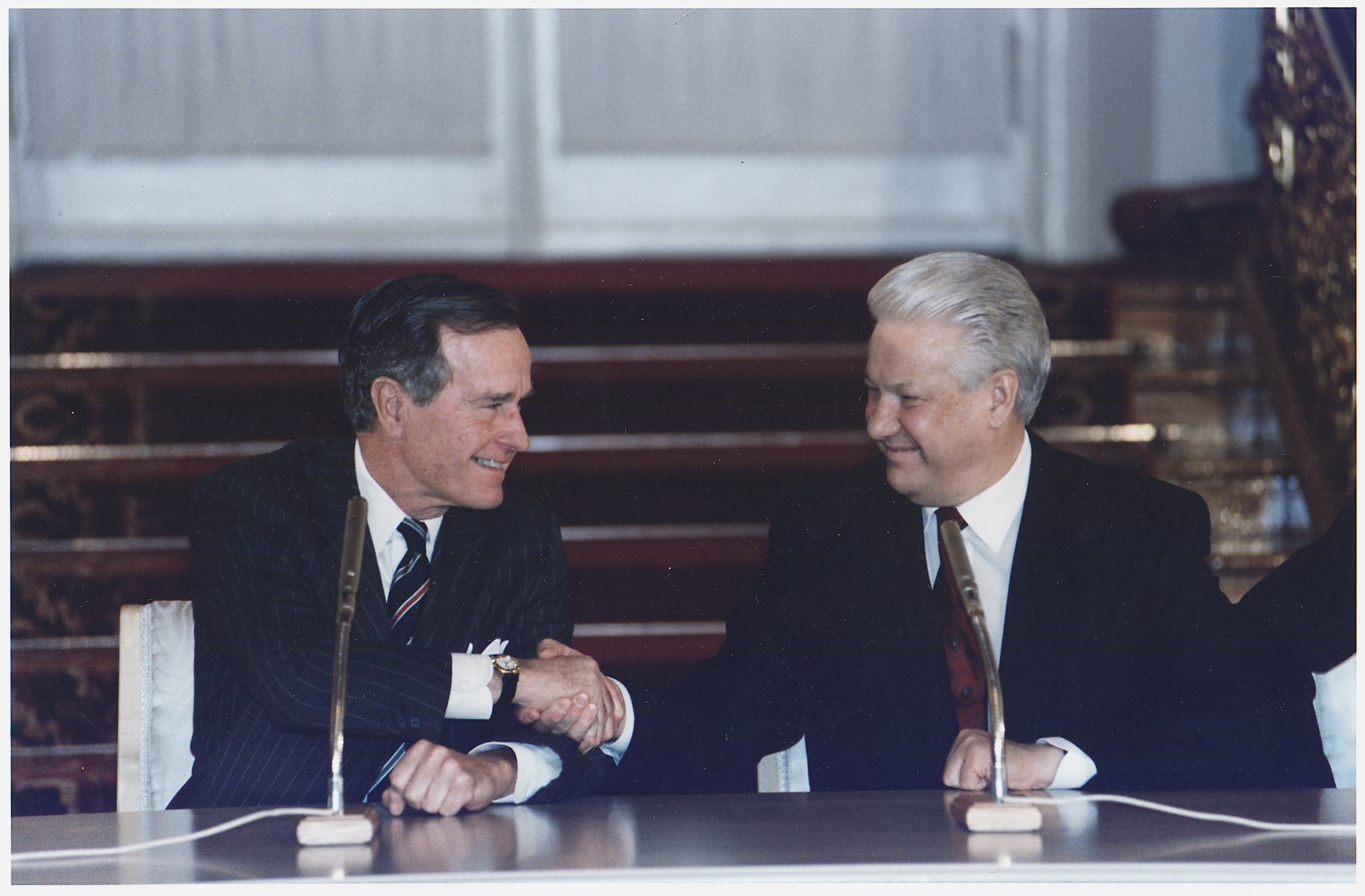
- Presidents George H. W. Bush and Boris Yeltsin sign START II on 3 January 1993 in Vladimir Hall, Moscow Kremlin
- Type: Strategic nuclear disarmament
- Drafted: 1991 – 17 June 1992
- Signed: 3 January 1993
- Location: Moscow, Russia
- Effective: 14 April 2000
- Condition: Ratification of both parties
- Expired: 13 June 2002
- Signatories: (United States) George H. W. Bush; (Russia) Boris Yeltsin
- Parties: United States; Russia; (officially withdrew in 2002)
- Ratifiers: U.S. Senate; State Duma
- Languages: English, Russian

START II (Strategic Arms Reduction Treaty) was a bilateral treaty between the United States and Russia on the Reduction and Limitation of Strategic Offensive Arms. It was signed by US president George H. W. Bush and Russian president Boris Yeltsin on 3 January 1993, banning the use of multiple independently targetable re-entry vehicles (MIRVs) on intercontinental ballistic missiles (ICBMs). Hence, it is often cited as the De-MIRV-ing Agreement.

It was ratified by the US Senate on 26 January 1996 with a vote of 87–4. Russia ratified START II on 14 April 2000, making it conditional on preserving the ABM Treaty and on US ratification of an addendum. The US Senate never ratified the addenum and, when the US withdrew from the ABM Treaty on 13 June 2002, Russia withdrew from START II one day later. Thus, START II never entered into effect.

Instead, SORT came into effect, which reduced the strategic warheads count per country to 1,700–2,200.

== Impact of MIRV ==
ICBMs using MIRVs are considered destabilizing because they put a premium on a first strike. These missiles can carry from two warheads to as many as 50 in some Soviet super-heavy missile designs. They can also carry a large number of decoys. Significant numbers of highly accurate warheads and decoys could annihilate an entire nation in a first strike, including a substantial amount of an opponent's missile silos and air force bomber fleet.

Hypothetically, if each side had 100 missiles, with five warheads each, and each side had a 95% chance of neutralizing its opponent's missiles in their silos by firing two warheads at each silo, the side that strikes first can reduce the enemy ICBM force from 100 missiles to about five by firing 40 missiles with 200 warheads and keeping the remaining 60 missiles in reserve. Thus, the destruction capability is greatly multiplied by MIRVs since the number of enemy silos does not significantly increase.

Both Soviet R-36M and US LGM-118 Peacekeeper missiles could carry up to 10 MIRVs though the latter are no longer operational.

== Negotiations ==
The historic agreement started on 17 June 1992 with the signing of a joint understanding by both presidents. The official signing of the treaty by the presidents took place on 3 January 1993. It was ratified by the US Senate on 26 January 1996 with a vote of 87–4. However, Russian ratification was stalled in the State Duma for many years. It was postponed many times to protest American military actions in Iraq and in Kosovo and to oppose the expansion of NATO in Eastern Europe. The treaty became less relevant as the years passed, and both sides started to lose interest in it.

On 14 April 2000, the Russian Duma finally ratified the treaty with some conditions. Specifically, these conditions were that the US would continue to uphold the ABM Treaty, and that the US Senate would ratify a September 1997 addendum to START II that included agreed statements on the demarcation of strategic and tactical missile defenses. The US Senate never ratified the addendum, as a faction of Republicans led by Jesse Helms opposed any limits on American anti-ballistic missile systems. As a result, START II never entered into force.

== Replaced by SORT ==
However, in 2001, US president George W. Bush set a plan in motion to reduce the country's missile forces from 6,000 to between 1,700 and 2,200.

Thus, the START II treaty was officially bypassed by the Strategic Offensive Reductions Treaty (SORT), which was agreed to by Bush and Russian president Vladimir Putin at their summit meeting in November 2001 and signed at Moscow Summit on 24 May 2002. Both sides agreed to reduce operationally deployed strategic nuclear warheads to 1,700 from 2,200 by 2012.

On 13 June 2002, the US withdrew from the ABM Treaty, and the following day, Russia announced that it would no longer consider itself to be bound by START II provisions. Both countries continued to pursue their objectives. Russia still retains 54 MIRV-capable RS-20/R-36M (SS-18 Satan) with 10 warheads each, 40 MIRV-capable RS-18/UR-100N (SS-19 Stiletto) with 6 warheads each and 24 MIRV-capable RS-24 Yars with 3 warheads each. The US developed the Ground-Based Midcourse Defense (GMD) system to protect itself from small-scale ICBM attacks.

In October 2002, the US began its unilateral withdrawal of MIRV (including complete deactivation of Peacekeeper missiles) and completed it by 19 September 2005. The Minuteman III is, as of 2011, the only American land-based operational ICBM. It can potentially carry only three RVs.

== See also ==
- START I
- START III
- New START
- SALT I and II
- INF Treaty
