= START I =

1991 Soviet Union–United States arms control treaty

START
Strategic Arms Reduction Treaty Договор о сокращении стратегических наступательных вооружений
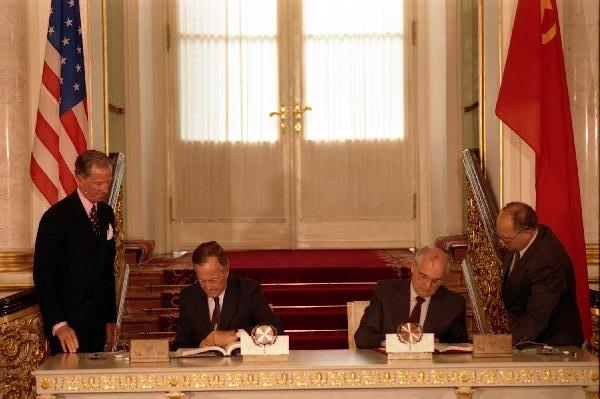
- Presidents George H. W. Bush and Mikhail Gorbachev sign START, 31 July 1991
- Type: Strategic nuclear disarmament
- Drafted: 29 June 1982 – June 1991
- Signed: 31 July 1991
- Location: Moscow, Soviet Union
- Effective: 5 December 1994
- Condition: Ratification of both parties
- Replaces: SALT
- Replaced by: New START
- Expired: 5 December 2009
- Signatories: (United States) George H. W. Bush; (Soviet Union) Mikhail Gorbachev
- Parties: United States; Soviet Union
- Languages: Russian, English

START I (Strategic Arms Reduction Treaty) was a bilateral treaty between the United States and the Soviet Union on the reduction and the limitation of strategic offensive arms. The treaty was signed on 31 July 1991 and entered into force on 5 December 1994. The treaty barred its signatories from deploying more than 6,000 nuclear warheads and a total of 1,600 intercontinental ballistic missiles (ICBMs) and bombers.

START negotiated the largest and most complex arms control treaty in history, and its final implementation in late 2001 resulted in the removal of about 80% of all strategic nuclear weapons then in existence. Proposed by U.S. president Ronald Reagan, it was renamed START I after negotiations began on START II.

Following the 1991 dissolution of the Soviet Union, the Lisbon Protocol bound the successor states Russia, Belarus, Ukraine, and Kazakhstan, to the terms of START, as all four were in possession of former Soviet strategic nuclear weapons. The protocol was signed in May 1992 and effective December 1994.

The treaty expired on 5 December 2009. On 8 April 2010, the replacement New START Treaty was signed in Prague by U.S. president Barack Obama and Russian president Dmitry Medvedev. Following its ratification by the U.S. Senate and the Federal Assembly of Russia, the treaty went into force on 5 February 2011, extending deep reductions of American and Soviet or Russian strategic nuclear weapons through February 2026. However, on 21 February 2023, Russia suspended its participation in New START but it did not withdraw from the treaty, and clarified that it would continue to abide by the numerical limits in the treaty. On 5 February 2026, New START officially expired.

== Proposal ==
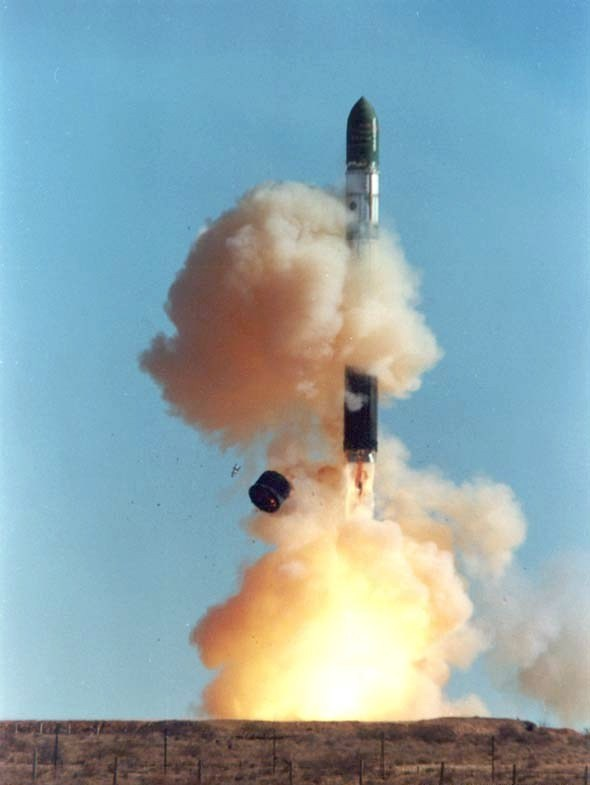
Soviet SS-18 intercontinental ballistic missile

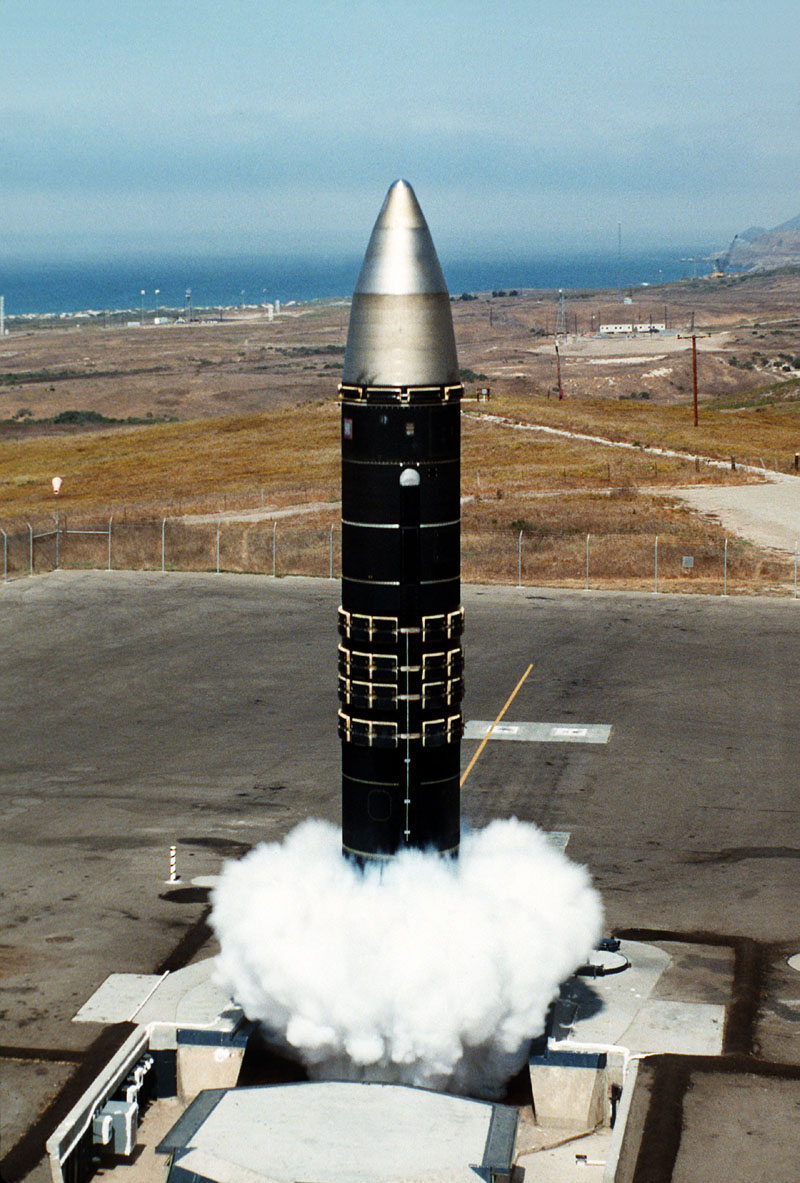
U.S. LGM-118 Peacekeeper intercontinental ballistic missile

The START proposal was first announced by U.S. president Ronald Reagan in a commencement address at his alma mater, Eureka College, on 9 May 1982, and presented by Reagan in Geneva on 29 June 1982. He proposed a dramatic reduction in strategic forces in two phases, which he referred to as SALT III.

The first phase would reduce overall warhead counts on any missile type to 5,000, with an additional limit of 2,500 on ICBMs. Additionally, a total of 850 ICBMs would be allowed, with a limit of 110 "heavy throw" missiles like the SS-18 and additional limitations on the total "throw weight" of the missiles.

The second phase introduced similar limits on heavy bombers and their warheads, as well as other strategic systems.

The U.S. then had a commanding lead in strategic bombers. The aging B-52 force was a credible strategic threat but was equipped with only AGM-86 cruise missiles beginning in 1982 because of Soviet air defense improvements in the early 1980s. The U.S. had begun to introduce the new B-1B Lancer quasi-stealth bomber as well and was secretly developing the Advanced Technology Bomber (ATB) project, which would eventually result in the B-2 Spirit stealth bomber.

The Soviet force was of little threat to the U.S., on the other hand, as it was tasked almost entirely with attacking U.S. convoys in the Atlantic and land targets on the Eurasian landmass. Although the Soviets had 1,200 medium and heavy bombers, only 150 of them (Tupolev Tu-95s and Myasishchev M-4s) could reach North America (the latter only by in-flight refueling). They also faced difficulty penetrating U.S. airspace, which was smaller and less defended. Having too few bombers available compared to U.S. bomber numbers was evened out by the U.S. forces being required to penetrate the Soviet airspace, which is much larger and more defended.

That changed in 1984, when new Tu-95MS and Tu-160 bombers appeared and were equipped with the first Soviet AS-15 cruise missiles. By limiting the phasing in, it was proposed that the U.S. would be left with a strategic advantage for a time.

As Time magazine put it, "Under Reagan's ceilings, the U.S. would have to make considerably less of an adjustment in its strategic forces than would the Soviet Union. That feature of the proposal will almost certainly prompt the Soviets to charge that it is unfair and one-sided. No doubt some American arms-control advocates will agree, accusing the Administration of making the Kremlin an offer it cannot possibly accept—a deceptively equal-looking, deliberately nonnegotiable proposal that is part of what some suspect is the hardliners' secret agenda of sabotaging disarmament so that the U.S. can get on with the business of rearmament." However, Time pointed out, "The Soviets' monstrous ICBMs have given them a nearly 3-to-1 advantage over the U.S. in 'throw weight'—the cumulative power to 'throw' megatons of death and destruction at the other nation."

== Costs ==
Three institutes ran studies in regards to the estimated costs that the U.S. government would have to pay to implement START I: the Congressional Budget Office (CBO), the U.S. Senate Foreign Relations Committee (SFRC), and the Institute for Defense Analyses (IDA). The CBO estimates assumed that the full-implementation cost would consist of a one-time cost of $410 to 1,830 million and that the continuing annual costs would be $100 to 390 million.

The SFRC had estimates of $200 to 1,000 million for one-time costs and that total inspection costs over the 15 years of the treaty would be $1,250 to 2,050 million.

Finally, the IDA estimated only the verification costs, which it claimed to be around $760 million.

In addition to the costs of implementing the treaty, the U.S. also aided the former Soviet republics with the Cooperative Threat Reduction Program (Nunn-Lugar Program), which added $591 million to the costs of implementing the START I program in the former Soviet Union, which would almost double the cost of the U.S. program.

After the treaty's implementation, the former Soviet Union's stock of nuclear weapons fell from 12,000 to 3,500. The U.S. would also save money since it would not have to be concerned with the upkeep and innovations of its nuclear forces. The CBO estimated that would amount to a total saving of $46 billion in the first five years of the treaty and around $130 billion until 2010, which would pay for the cost of the implementation of the treaty about twenty times over.

The other risk associated with START was the failure of compliance on the side of Russia. The U.S. Senate Defence Committee expressed concerns that Russia could covertly produce missiles, produce false numbers regarding the numbers of warheads, and monitor cruise missiles.

The Joint Chiefs of Staff assessment of those situations determined the risk of a significant treaty violation within acceptable limits. Another risk would be the ability of Russia to perform espionage during the inspection of U.S. bases and military facilities. The risk was also determined to be an acceptable factor by the assessment.

Considering the potential savings from the implementation of START I and its relatively-low risk factor, Reagan and the U.S. government deemed it a reasonable plan of action towards the goal of disarmament.

== Negotiations ==
Negotiations for START I began in May 1982, but continued negotiation of the START process was delayed several times because U.S. agreement terms were considered nonnegotiable by pre-Gorbachev Soviet rulers. Reagan's introduction of the Strategic Defense Initiative (SDI) program in 1983 was viewed as a threat by the Soviets, who withdrew from setting a timetable for further negotiations. In January 1985, however, U.S. Secretary of State George Shultz and Soviet foreign minister Andrei Gromyko discussed a formula for a three-part negotiation strategy that included intermediate-range forces, strategic defense, and missile defense. During the Reykjavík Summit between Reagan and Gorbachev in October 1986, negotiations towards the implementation of the START Program were accelerated and turned towards the reduction of strategic weapons after the Intermediate-Range Nuclear Forces Treaty was signed in December 1987.

However, a dramatic nuclear arms race proceeded in the 1980s. It ended in 1991 with nuclear parity preservation with 10,000 strategic warheads on both sides.

== Verification tools ==
The verification regimes in arms control treaties contain many tools to hold parties accountable for their actions and violations of their treaty agreements. The START Treaty verification provisions were the most complicated and demanding of any agreement at the time by providing twelve different types of inspection. Data exchanges and declarations between parties became required and included exact quantities, technical characteristics, locations, movements, and the status of all offensive nuclear threats. The national technical means of verification (NTM) provision protected satellites and other information-gathering systems controlled by the verifying side, as they helped to verify adherence to international treaties. The international technical means of verification provision protected the multilateral technical systems specified in other treaties. Co-operative measures were established to facilitate verification by the NTM and included displaying items in plain sight and not hiding them from detection. The new on-site inspections (OSI) and Perimeter and Portal Continuous Monitoring (PPCM) provisions helped to maintain the treaty's integrity by providing a regulatory system handled by a representative from the verifying side at all times. In addition, access to telemetry from ballistic missile flight tests was required, including exchanges of tapes and a ban on encryption and encapsulation from both parties.

== Signing ==
Negotiations that led to the signing of the treaty began in May 1982. In November 1983, the Soviet Union "discontinued" communication with the U.S., which had deployed intermediate-range missiles in Europe. In January 1985, U.S. Secretary of State George Shultz and Soviet foreign minister Andrey Gromyko negotiated a three-part plan, including strategic weapons, intermediate missiles, and missile defense. It received a lot of attention at the Reykjavik Summit between Ronald Reagan and Mikhail Gorbachev and ultimately led to the signing of the Intermediate-Range Nuclear Forces Treaty in December 1987. Talk of a comprehensive strategic arms reduction continued, and the START Treaty was officially signed by U.S. president George H. W. Bush and Soviet general secretary Gorbachev on 31 July 1991.

== Implementation ==
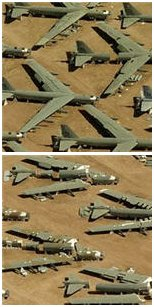
B-52G Stratofortresses chopped into five pieces at the Aerospace Maintenance and Regeneration Center

There were 375 B-52s flown to the Aerospace Maintenance and Regeneration Center at Davis-Monthan Air Force Base, in Arizona. The bombers were stripped of all usable parts and chopped into five pieces by a 13,000-pound (5,900 kg) steel blade dropped from a crane. The guillotine sliced four times on each plane, which severed the wings and left the fuselage in three pieces. The dissected B-52s remained in place for three months so that Russian satellites could confirm that the bombers had been destroyed, and they were then sold for scrap.

After the collapse of the Soviet Union, treaty obligations were passed to twelve Soviet successor states. Of those, Turkmenistan and Uzbekistan each eliminated its one nuclear-related site, and on-site inspections were discontinued. Inspections continued in Belarus, Kazakhstan, the Russian Federation, and Ukraine. Belarus, Kazakhstan, and Ukraine became non-nuclear weapons states under the Treaty on the Non-Proliferation of Nuclear Weapons on 1 July 1968 and are committed to it under the 1992 Lisbon Protocol (Protocol to the Treaty Between the United States of America and the Union of Soviet Socialist Republics on the Reduction and Limitation of Strategic Offensive Arms).

== Efficacy ==
Belarus, Kazakhstan, and Ukraine have disposed of all their nuclear weapons or transferred them to Russia. The U.S. and Russia have reduced the capacity of delivery vehicles to 1,600 each, with no more than 6,000 warheads.

A report by the U.S. State Department, "Adherence to and Compliance With Arms Control, Nonproliferation and Disarmament Agreements and Commitments," was released on 28 July 2010 and stated that Russia was not in full compliance with the treaty when it expired on 5 December 2009. The report did not specifically identify Russia's compliance issues.

One incident concerning Russia violating the START I Treaty occurred in 1994. It was announced by Arms Control and Disarmament Agency Director John Holum in a congressional testimony that Russia had converted its SS-19 ICBM into a space-launch vehicle without notifying the appropriate parties. Russia justified the incident by claiming it did not have to follow all of START's reporting policies regarding missiles that had been recreated into space-launch vehicles. In addition to the SS-19, Russia reportedly used SS-25 missiles to assemble space-launch vehicles. The issue that the U.S. had was that it did not have accurate numbers and locations of Russian ICBMs with those violations. The dispute was resolved in 1995.

== Expiration and renewal ==
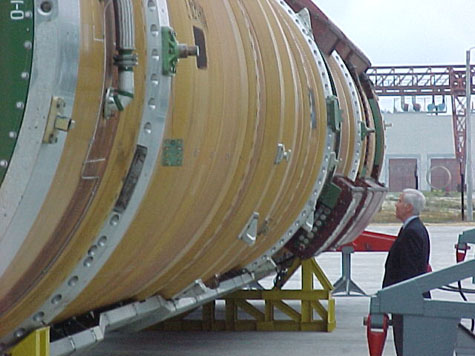
Soviet SS-18 inspected by U.S. Senator Richard Lugar before its destruction

START I expired on 5 December 2009, but both sides agreed to keep observing the terms of the treaty until a new agreement was reached. There are proposals to renew and expand the treaty, supported by U.S. president Barack Obama. Sergei Rogov, director of the Institute of the U.S. and Canada, said: "Obama supports sharp reductions in nuclear arsenals, and I believe that Russia and the U.S. may sign in the summer or fall of 2009 a new treaty that would replace START-1." He added that a new deal would happen only if Washington abandoned plans to place elements of a missile shield in Central Europe. He expressed willingness "to make new steps in the sphere of disarmament" but said that he was waiting for the U.S. to abandon attempts to "surround Russia with a missile defense ring" in reference to the placement of ten interceptor missiles in Poland and accompanying radar in the Czech Republic.

On 17 March 2009, Medvedev signaled that Russia would begin "large-scale" rearmament and renewal of Russia's nuclear arsenal. He accused NATO of expanding near Russian borders and ordered the rearmament to commence in 2011 with an increased army, naval, and nuclear capabilities. Also, the head of Russia's strategic missile forces, Nikolai Solovtsov, told news agencies that Russia would start deploying its next-generation RS-24 missiles after the 5 December expiry of the START I. Russia hopes to form a new treaty. The increased tensions came despite the warming of relations between the U.S. and Russia in the two years since Obama had taken office.

On 4 May 2009, the U.S. and Russia began renegotiating START and counting nuclear warheads and their delivery vehicles in making a new agreement. While setting aside problematic issues between the two countries, both sides agreed to make further cuts in the number of warheads deployed to around 1,000 to 1,500 each. The U.S. said that it is open to a Russian proposal to use radar in Azerbaijan rather than Eastern Europe for the proposed missile system. The George W. Bush administration insisted that the Eastern Europe defense system was intended as a deterrent for Iran, but Russia feared that it could be used against itself. The flexibility by both sides to make compromises now will lead to a new phase of arms reduction in the future.

A "Joint understanding for a follow-on agreement to START-1" was signed by Obama and Medvedev in Moscow on 6 July 2009 to reduce the number of deployed warheads on each side to 1,500–1,675 on 500–1,100 delivery systems. A new treaty was to be signed before START-1 expired in December 2009, with reductions to be achieved within seven years. After many months of negotiations, Obama and Medvedev signed the successor treaty, Measures to Further Reduction and Limitation of Strategic Offensive Arms, in Prague, Czech Republic, on 8 April 2010.

== New START Treaty ==
The New START Treaty imposed even more limitations on the United States and Russia by reducing them to significantly-less strategic arms within seven years of its entering full force. Organized into three tiers, the new treaty focuses on the treaty itself, a protocol containing additional rights and obligations regarding the treaty provisions, and technical annexes.

The limits were based on rigorous analysis conducted by Department of Defense planners in support of the 2010 Nuclear Posture Review. These aggregate limits consist of 1,550 nuclear warheads, which include warheads on deployed intercontinental ballistic missiles (ICBM), warheads on deployed submarine-launched ballistic missiles (SLBM), and even any deployed heavy bomber equipped for nuclear armaments. That is 74% fewer than the limit set in the 1991 Treaty and 30% fewer than the limit of the 2002 Treaty of Moscow. Both parties will also be limited to 800 deployed and non-deployed ICBM launchers, SLBM launchers, and heavy bombers equipped with nuclear armaments. There is also a separate limit of 700 deployed ICBMs, deployed SLBMs, and deployed heavy bombers equipped for nuclear armaments, which is less than half the corresponding strategic nuclear delivery vehicle limit imposed in the previous treaty. Although the new restrictions have been set, the new treaty does not contain any limitations regarding the testing, developing, or deploying current or planned U.S. missile defense programs and low-range conventional strike capabilities.

The duration of the new treaty is ten years and can be extended for no more than five years at a time. It includes a standard withdrawal clause like most other arms control agreements. Subsequent treaties have superseded the treaty.

== Memorandum of Understanding data ==
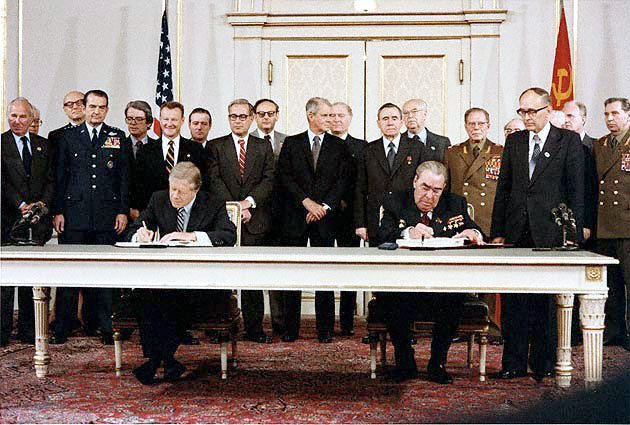
Jimmy Carter and Leonid Brezhnev sign SALT II treaty, 18 June 1979, in Vienna.

Russian Federation
Date	Deployed ICBMs and Their Associated Launchers, Deployed SLBMs and Their Associated Launchers, and Deployed Heavy Bombers	Warheads Attributed to Deployed ICBMs, Deployed SLBMs, and Deployed Heavy Bombers	Warheads Attributed to Deployed ICBMs and Deployed SLBMs	Throw-weight of Deployed ICBMs and Deployed SLBMs (Mt)
1 July 2009	809	3,897	3,289	2,297.0
1 January 2009	814	3,909	3,239	2,301.8
1 January 2008	952	4,147	3,515	2,373.5
1 September 1990 (USSR)	2,500	10,271	9,416	6,626.3

United States of America
Date	Deployed ICBMs and Their Associated Launchers, Deployed SLBMs and Their Associated Launchers, and Deployed Heavy Bombers	Warheads Attributed to Deployed ICBMs, Deployed SLBMs, and Deployed Heavy Bombers	Warheads Attributed to Deployed ICBMs and Deployed SLBMs	Throw-weight of Deployed ICBMs and Deployed SLBMs (Mt)
1 July 2009	1,188	4268	3451	1,857.3
1 January 2009	1,198	3989	3272	1,717.3
1 January 2008	1,225	4468	3628	1,826.1
1 September 1990	2,246	10,563	8,200	2,361.3

== See also ==
- Strategic Arms Limitation Talks
- START II
- START III
- RS-24
- New START
