= Margelov =

Margelov (Russian: Маргелов) is a Russian masculine surname, its feminine counterpart is Margelova. It may refer to

- Mikhail Margelov (born 1964), Russian politician
- Vasily Margelov (1908–1990), Soviet general
  - Medal "Army General Margelov"
- Vitaly Vasilyevich Margelov (1941-2021), Soviet and Russian general and politician
