= New Start (Fastlane album) =

Studio album by Fastlane
- Released: March 2005 UK / October 2005 JPN
- Genre: Rock, Pop, Punk
- Label: Sucka Punch Records UK / Pyropit Records JPN
- Producer: Iain Wetherall, Fastlane

Fastlane chronology
New Start (2005)	Overdrive (2006)

Alternative cover

Professional ratings
Review scores
Source	Rating
Punktastic	not rated
AbsolutePunk	not rated
Hussieskunk	not rated
Pep-Rock	not rated
Rock Freaks	not rated

New Start is the debut release from Fastlane, which was released in March, 2005 by Suckapunch Records in the UK, and October, 2005 by Pyropit Records in Japan.

== Track listing ==
1. Virus
2. Eyes Closed
3. Summer Falls
4. Dreaming
5. Elevator
6. Comfortable Silence
7. A New Start
8. 3rd Degree
9. Forget What We Were
10. Million Times
11. When It's Over
