= New START =

2011–2026 US-Russian arms control treaty

New START / СНВ-III
Treaty Between the United States of America and the Russian Federation on Measures for the Further Reduction and Limitation of Strategic Offensive Arms Договор между Российской Федерацией и Соединёнными Штатами Америки о мерах по дальнейшему сокращению и ограничению стратегических наступательных вооружений
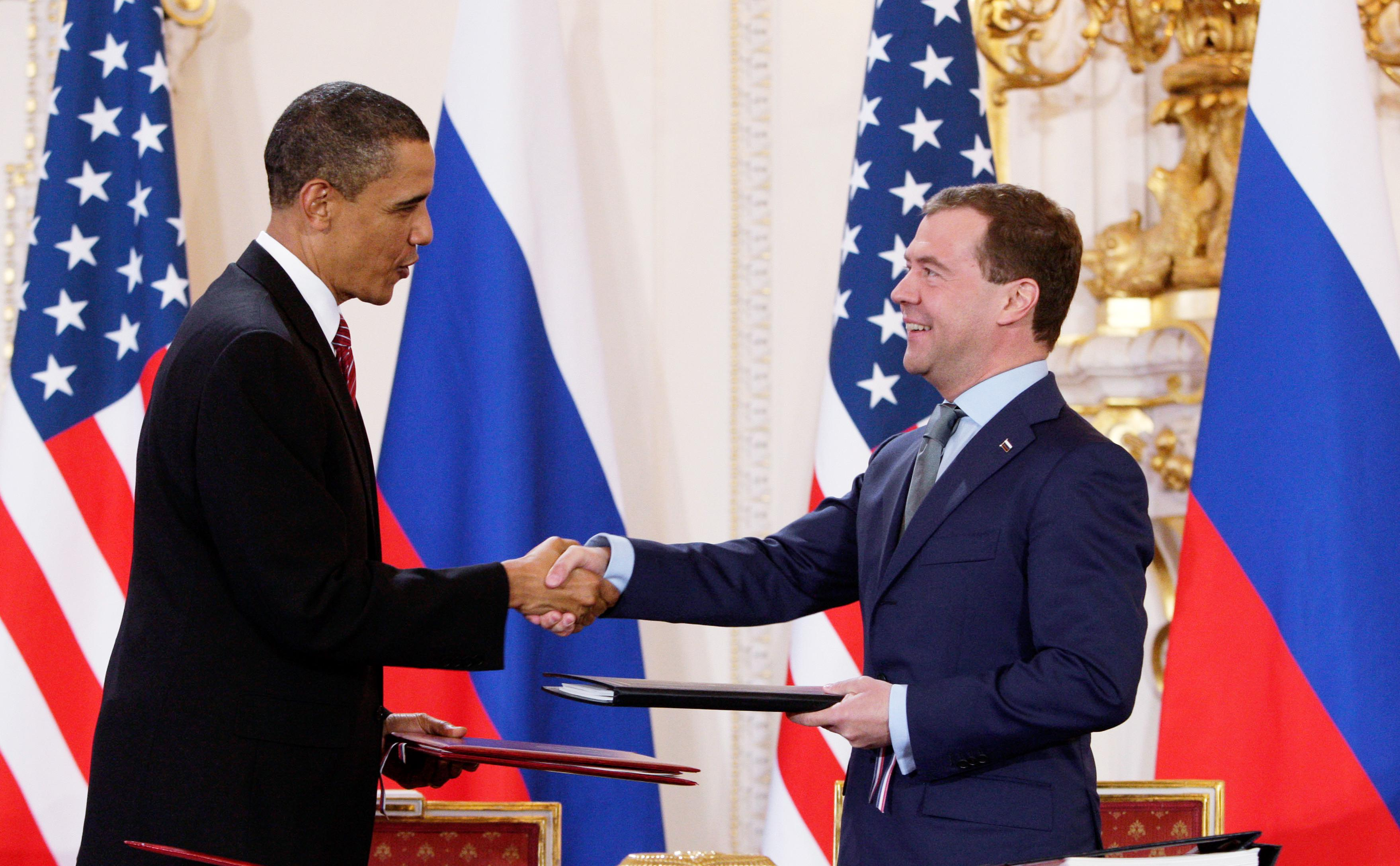
- Presidents Obama and Medvedev shown after signing the Prague Treaty
- Type: Strategic nuclear disarmament
- Drafted: 19 May – 9 November 2009
- Signed: 8 April 2010
- Location: Prague, Czech Republic
- Effective: 5 February 2011
- Condition: Ratification of both parties
- Replaces: START I
- Expired: 5 February 2026 (Note: Original following extension in 2021.) (Note: Participation suspended by Russia on 21 February 2023, though treaty was still in effect.)
- Parties: United States; Russia
- Languages: English, Russian

New START (Note: Russian abbreviation: СНВ-III ('SNV-III') from сокращение стратегических наступательных вооружений ('reduction of strategic offensive arms')) was a nuclear arms reduction treaty between the United States and Russia with the formal name of Measures for the Further Reduction and Limitation of Strategic Offensive Arms. It was signed on 8 April 2010 in Prague, and after ratification it entered into force on 5 February 2011.

New START replaced the Treaty of Moscow (SORT), which was to expire in December 2012. It followed the START I treaty, which expired in December 2009; the proposed START II treaty which never entered into force; and the START III treaty, for which negotiations were never concluded.

The treaty called for halving the number of strategic nuclear missile launchers. It also called for the establishment of a new inspection and verification regime, replacing the SORT mechanism. It did not limit the number of operationally inactive nuclear warheads that can be stockpiled.

On 21 February 2023, Russia suspended its participation in New START. However, it did not withdraw from the treaty, and clarified that it would continue to abide by the numerical limits in the treaty. On 5 February 2026, the treaty officially expired.

== Overview ==
Signing the New START Treaty (video in Russian)

The treaty limited the number of deployed strategic nuclear warheads for each party to 1,550, which was down nearly two-thirds from the original START treaty, as well as 10% lower than the deployed strategic warhead limit of the 2002 Moscow Treaty. The total number of deployed warheads could exceed the 1,550 limit by a few hundred because only one warhead is counted per bomber regardless of how many it actually carries. The treaty also limited the number of deployed and non-deployed intercontinental ballistic missile (ICBM) launchers, submarine-launched ballistic missile (SLBM) launchers, and heavy bombers equipped for nuclear armaments to 800. The number of deployed ICBMs, SLBMs, and heavy bombers equipped for nuclear armaments was limited to 700. The treaty allowed for satellite and remote monitoring, as well as 18 on-site inspections per year to verify limits.

Summary of New START limits
Type	Limit
Deployed missiles and bombers	700
Deployed warheads (MIRVs and bombers)	1,550
Deployed and non-deployed launchers (missile tubes and bombers)	800

The obligations had to be met within seven years from the date the treaty entered into force. The treaty was set to last ten years, with an option to renew it for up to five years upon the agreement of both parties. The treaty entered into force on 5 February 2011, when the United States and Russia exchanged instruments of ratification, following approval by the U.S. Senate and the Federal Assembly of Russia. The United States began implementing the reductions before the treaty was ratified.

Documents made available to the U.S. Senate described removal from service of at least 30 missile silos, 34 bombers, and 56 submarine launch tubes. Missiles which were removed would stay intact, and bombers could be converted to conventional use. Four of the twenty-four launchers on each of the fourteen ballistic missile nuclear submarines would be removed, and none retired.

The treaty placed no limits on tactical systems. In July 2010, Rebecca Grant for Air & Space Forces Magazine reported that no limit was placed on the Lockheed Martin F-35 Lightning II, which would most likely be replacing the F-15E and F-16 in the tactical nuclear delivery role.

The treaty did not cover rail-mobile ICBM launchers because neither party possessed such systems at the time. ICBMs on such launchers would be covered under the generic launcher limits, but the inspection details for such systems would have to be worked out between the parties if such systems were reintroduced in the future.

== History ==
=== Drafting and signature ===
The New START treaty was the successor to the START I. The START II was signed but not ratified and the START III negotiating process was not successful.

The drafting of the treaty commenced in April 2009 immediately after the meeting between the presidents of the two countries involved, Barack Obama and Dmitry Medvedev, in London. Preliminary talks had already been held in Rome on 27 April, although it was initially planned to have them scheduled in the middle of May.

Prolonged talks were conducted by U.S. and Russian delegations, led on the American side by U.S. State Department assistant secretary Rose Gottemoeller. The Russian delegation was headed by Anatoly Antonov, director of security and disarmament at the Russian Ministry of Foreign Affairs.

Talks were held on:

- First round: 19–20 May 2009, Moscow
- Second round: 1–3 June 2009, Geneva, Switzerland
- Third round: 22–24 June 2009, Geneva
- Fourth round: 22–24 July 2009, Geneva
- Fifth round: 31 August – 2 September 2009, Geneva
- Sixth round: 21–28 September 2009, Geneva
- Seventh round: 19–30 October 2009, Geneva
- Eighth round: 9 November 2009, Geneva

On the morning of 6 July 2009, the agreement on the text of the "Joint Understanding on Further Reduction and Limitation of Strategic Offensive Arms" was announced, which Medvedev and Obama signed during the US presidential visit to Moscow which began on the same day. The document listed the intention of both parties to reduce the number of nuclear warheads to 1,500–1,675 units, as well as their delivery weapons to 500–1,100 units.

Presidents Obama and Medvedev announced on 26 March 2010 that they had reached an agreement, and they signed the treaty on 8 April 2010 in Prague.

=== Ratification process ===
==== United States ====
On 13 May, the agreement was submitted by Obama for ratification in the U.S. Senate. Ratification required 67 votes in favor (out of 100 Senators). On Tuesday, 16 September 2010, the Senate Foreign Relations Committee voted 14–4 in favor of ratifying New START. The measure had support from three Senate Republicans: Richard Lugar of Indiana, Bob Corker of Tennessee, and Johnny Isakson of Georgia. Senator John Kerry and Secretary of State Hillary Clinton expressed optimism that a deal on ratification was near.

Republicans in the Senate generally deferred to Jon Kyl (R-AZ), a leading conservative on defense issues, who sought a strong commitment to modernize U.S. nuclear forces and questioned whether there was time for ratification during the lame-duck session, calling for an opening of the negotiation record before a vote was held. Senator Ben Nelson (D-NE) joined Kyl in expressing skepticism over the timing of ratification; Senator Kit Bond (R-MO) expressed opposition.

Obama made New START ratification a priority during the 2010 post-election lame duck session of Congress, and Senators John Kerry (D-MA) and Richard Lugar (R-IN), the Democratic Chairman and senior Republican on the Senate Foreign Relations Committee, were leading supporters of the treaty.

On 22 December 2010, the U.S. Senate gave its advice and consent to ratification of the treaty by a vote of 71 to 26 on the resolution of ratification. Thirteen Republican senators, all 56 Democratic senators, and both Independent senators voted for the treaty. Obama signed documents completing the U.S. ratification process on 2 February 2011.

==== Russia ====
Following ratification by the U.S. Senate, the formal first reading of the treaty was held on 24 December, and the State Duma voted its approval. The State Duma approved a second reading of the treaty on 14 January 2011. It was then approved unanimously by the Federation Council on the next day.

On 28 January 2011, Medvedev signed the ratification resolution passed by the Federal Assembly, completing the Russian ratification process. The treaty went into force when Russian Foreign Minister Sergei Lavrov and U.S. Secretary of State Hillary Clinton exchanged the instruments of ratification at the Security Conference in Munich, Germany, on 5 February 2011.

=== Deadlines ===
The New START Treaty required several specific actions within periods after it entered into force (EIF) on February 5, 2011:

- No later than (NLT) 5 days after EIF

Exchange Inspection Airplane Information:
Lists of the types of airplanes intended to transport inspectors to points of entry will be exchanged.

- NLT 25 days after EIF

Exchange Lists of Inspectors and Aircrew Members:
Lists of initial inspectors and aircrew will be exchanged.

- NLT 45 days after EIF

Exchange databases:
Databases will provide information on the numbers, locations, and technical characteristics of weapon systems and facilities that are covered under the Treaty.

- NLT 60 days after EIF

Exhibition: Strategic Offensive Arms:
If a type, variant, or version of a strategic offensive arm (SOA) that was not exhibited in connection with the START Treaty is declared, then the SOA's features and technical characteristics must be demonstrated and confirmed.

- 60 days after EIF

Right to Conduct Inspections Begins:
Parties may begin inspections, 18 on-site inspections per year are provided in the Treaty. Each Party is allowed ten Type One Inspections and eight Type Two Inspections.

1. Type One Inspections focus on deployed and non-deployed SOAs sites. Activities include confirming accuracy of data on SOAs, the number of warheads located on designated deployed ICBMs and SLBMs, and the number of nuclear armaments to be on designated deployed heavy bombers.
2. Type Two Inspections focus on sites with non-deployed SOAs. They can involve confirmation of the conversion/elimination of SOAs, and confirming the elimination of facilities.

- NLT 120 days after EIF

Exhibition: Heavy Bombers at Davis-Monthan Air Force Base:
The United States will conduct a one-time exhibition of each type of environmentally-sealed deployed heavy bombers which are located at the storage facility at Davis-Monthan Air Force Base in Arizona.

- NLT 180 days after EIF

Initial Demonstration of Telemetry Playback Equipment:
Parties will conduct an initial demonstration of recording media and playback equipment for telemetric information, information that originates on a missile during its initial motion and flight.

- NLT 225 days after EIF

Exchange Updated Databases:
Parties will exchange updated databases and every six months thereafter for the duration of the Treaty.

- NLT 1 year after EIF

Exhibition: B-1B Heavy Bomber:
The United States will conduct a one-time exhibition of a B-1B heavy bomber equipped with non-nuclear armaments to demonstrate it no longer can employ nuclear armaments.

- NLT 3 years after EIF

Exhibition: Previously Converted Missile Launchers:
The United States will conduct a one-time exhibition of its four SSGNs, which are equipped with cruise missile launchers and were converted from nuclear ballistic submarines, to confirm that SSGNs cannot launch SLBMs. The United States will also hold an exhibition of the five converted ICBM launcher silos at Vandenberg Air Force Base in California, now used as missile defense interceptor launchers. This will confirm that the converted launchers are no longer able to launch ICBMs and determine the features to distinguish converted silo launchers from unconverted ones.

- NLT 7 years after EIF

Meet Central Treaty Limits:
Parties are required to meet the limits laid out in the Treaty for deployed strategic warheads, and deployed and non-deployed strategic delivery vehicles and launchers.

- 10 years after EIF

Treaty Expires:
Unless Parties agree with an extension for up to five years.

== U.S. public debate ==
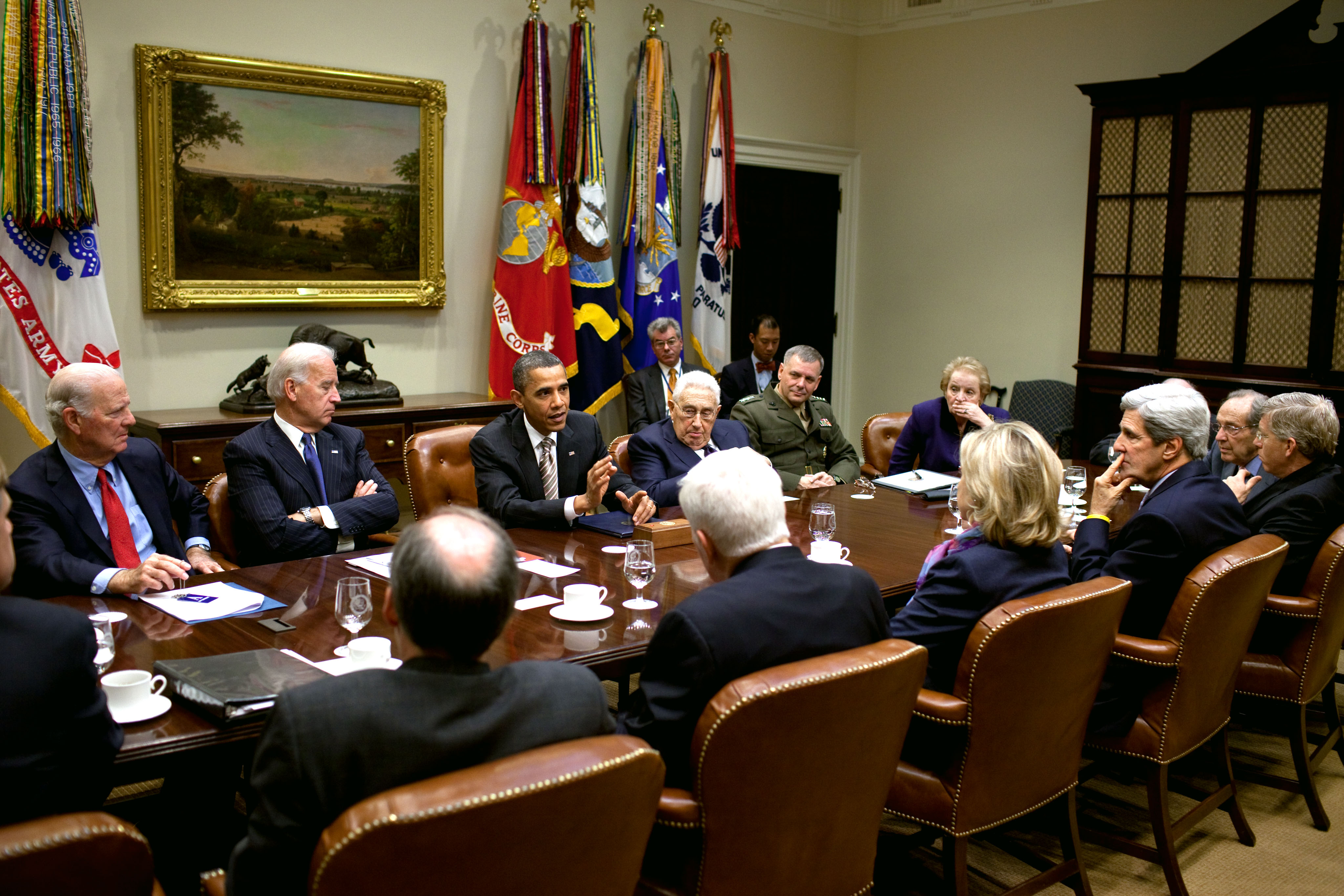
Obama administration officials discussing the New START Treaty at a meeting

A debate about whether to ratify the treaty took place in the United States during the run-up to the 2010 midterm elections and in the lame-duck congressional session afterward. While a public opinion poll showed broad support for ratification, another showed general skepticism over nuclear arms reductions.

The Arms Control Association led efforts to rally political support, arguing that the treaty is needed to restore on-site verification and lend predictability to the U.S.–Russian strategic relationship. Other organizations supporting the treaty included the Federation of American Scientists, and disarmament expert Peter Wilk of Physicians for Social Responsibility called the New START treaty "essential" to ensuring a safer world and stronger diplomatic ties with Russia.

Republican supporters included former President George H. W. Bush and all six former Republican Secretaries of State, who wrote supportive op-eds in The Washington Post and The Wall Street Journal. Conservative columnist Robert Kagan who supported the treaty, says its goals are modest compared to previous START treaties and that the treaty should not fail because of partisan disagreements. Kagan said the Republican insistence on upgrading the U.S. nuclear arsenal was reasonable but would not be affected by the current language of the treaty.

Heritage Action, an advocacy group affiliated with The Heritage Foundation, took the lead in opposing New START, lobbying the Senate along with running a petition drive and airing political advertisements before November's midterm elections. The effort drew the support of likely presidential candidate Mitt Romney and has been credited by former Senate Majority Leader Tom Daschle as changing some Republican votes. According to Edwin Feulner, then president of The Heritage Foundation, the language of the New START treaty would "definitely" reduce America's nuclear weapon capacity but "wouldn't necessarily" reduce Russia's, and Russia would maintain a 10–1 advantage in tactical nuclear weapons, which are not counted in the treaty.

Arms control experts critical of the treaty included Robert Joseph, former undersecretary of state for arms control and international security, and Eric Edelman, undersecretary of defense for policy, who have written that the treaty weakens U.S. defenses. Former CIA Director James Woolsey also said that "concessions to Russian demands make it difficult to support Senate approval of the new treaty".

Senators Jon Kyl and Mitch McConnell complained about a lack of funding for the Next-Generation Bomber during the treaty debate, even though this treaty would not constrain this platform. During the Senatorial debate over the US ratification of the New START Treaty with Russia, Senator James Inhofe (R-OK) stated, "Russia cheats in every arms control treaty we have with them", which caused an uproar in Russian media. Additionally, there were concerns about the possibility of restrictions being imposed on the deployment of missile defense systems by the U.S.

The Pentagon's "Report on the Strategic Nuclear Forces of the Russian Federation Pursuant to Section 1240 of the National Defense Authorization Act for Fiscal Year 2012" found that even if Russia did cheat and achieved a total surprise attack with a breakout force, it would have "little to no effect" on U.S. nuclear retaliatory capabilities.

== Treaty activities and status of New START ==
=== Monitoring and verification ===
During the negotiations for New START, verification was one of the core tenets deliberated between the United States and the Russian Federation. When New START entered into force, both participating states could begin performing inspections on each other. Each state is granted 18 on-site inspections per year, which fall into two categories: Type 1 and Type 2 inspections. Type 1 inspections are specific to military bases that house only deployed ICBMs, SLBMs, and bombers. Type 2 inspections include facilities that have non-deployed systems as well. The treaty allows only ten Type 1 and eight Type 2 inspections annually. States can also announce the arrival of an inspection team with as little notice as 32 hours. Since 2011, both states have made gradual progress in their reductions. By February 2018, both parties had reached their reduction goals well within the treaty limits.

Current information on the aggregate numbers and the locations of nuclear weapons has been made public under the treaty, and on 13 May 2011, three former U.S. officials and two non-proliferation experts signed an open letter to both sides asking that the information be released to promote transparency, reduce mistrust, and support the nuclear arms control process in other states. These are the most recent values reported from inspection activities.

New START treaty strategic arms numbers as of 1 September 2022
State	Deployed ICBMs, deployed SLBMs, and deployed heavy bombers	Warheads on deployed ICBMs, deployed SLBMs, and nuclear warheads counted for deployed heavy bombers	Deployed and non-deployed launchers of ICBMs and SLBMs, and deployed and non-deployed heavy bombers
Russian Federation	540	1549	759
United States of America	659	1420	800

=== Russian and US strategic forces before New START ===
The data that follows was made public under the prior START treaty.

Memorandum of Understanding data for the expired START 1 on 1 July 2009
State	Deployed ICBMs and their associated launchers, deployed SLBMs and their associated launchers, and deployed heavy bombers	Warheads attributed to deployed ICBMs, deployed SLBMs, and deployed heavy bombers	Warheads attributed to deployed ICBMs and deployed SLBMs	Throw-weight of deployed ICBMs and deployed SLBMs (Mt)
Russian Federation	809	3,897	3,289	2,297.0
United States of America	1,188	5,916	4,864	1,857.3

Operative Russian strategic nuclear forces, 2009
	Delivery vehicles	Warheads
ICBM (total)	383	1,355
R-36M UTTH / M2 (SS-18 M4/M5)	68	680
UR-100N UTTH (SS-19)	72	432
RT-2PM Topol mobile (SS-25)	180	180
RT-2PM2 Topol M silo (SS-27)	50	50
RT-2PM2 Topol M mobile (SS-27 M1)	15	15
RS-24 Yars mobile (SS-29 Mod-X-2)	0	0
SLBM (total)	10/160	576
R-29 RL (SS-N-18)	64	192
R-29 RM (SS-N-23)	48	192
R-29 RMU Sineva (SS-N-23)	48	192
RSM-56 Bulava (SS-NX-30)	0	0
Bomber force (total)	77	856
Tu-95 MS6 (Bear H6)	32	192
Tu-95 MS16 (Bear H16)	31	496
Tu-160 (Blackjack)	14	168
Strategic forces (total)	620	2,787

Operative American strategic nuclear forces, 2009
	Delivery vehicles	Warheads
ICBM (total)	450	550
Minuteman III W78/Mk12A	250	350
Minuteman III W87/Mk21	200	200
SLBM (total)	288	1,152
UGM-133A Trident II D-5 W76-0/Mk4	288	718
UGM-133A Trident II D-5 W76-1/Mk4A	288	50
UGM-133A Trident II D-5 W88/Mk5	288	384
Bomber force (total)	113	500
B-2	20	na
B-52H	93	na
B61-7	na	150
B61-11	na	
B-83	na	
ALCM/W80-1	na	350
Strategic forces (total)	851	2,202

== Extension progress ==
=== 2017 ===
On 9 February 2017, in US President Donald Trump's first telephone call to him, Russian president Vladimir Putin inquired about extending New START, which Trump dismissed as too favorable for Russia and "one of several bad deals negotiated by the Obama administration".

=== 2019 ===
The announcement of the US departure from the Intermediate-Range Nuclear Forces Treaty raised concerns about whether a New START extension was possible. On 12 June, Andrea Thompson, U.S. undersecretary of state for arms control and international security, and Russian Deputy Foreign Minister Sergey Ryabkov met for the first time since 2017. These discussions included the importance of negotiating a multilateral treaty, which would include China, France, and the United Kingdom. Many members of Congress wrote a letter urging the Trump administration to extend New START, citing its importance to nuclear security and its robust verification regime. Delegations from both the US and Russia met in Geneva in July 2019 to begin discussions on arms control, including how to include China in a future three-way nuclear arms control treaty. On 1 November 2019, Vladimir Leontyev, a Russian foreign ministry official, was quoted as saying he did not believe there was enough time left for Moscow and Washington to draft a replacement to the New START treaty before it expired in 2021. In December 2019, Putin publicly offered the US an immediate extension to the treaty without any modifications and gave US inspectors a chance to inspect a new hypersonic glide vehicle, Avangard, which would fall under the New START limits.

=== 2020 ===
In February 2020, the Trump administration announced plans to pursue nuclear arms control negotiations with Russia, which had not occurred since Secretary of State Pompeo's testimony that conversations on renewing New START were beginning.

In light of the COVID-19 pandemic, inspections of missile sites of both the US and Russia, typically conducted to ensure compliance with the treaty, were suspended.

In July 2020, US and Russian officials met in Vienna for arms control talks. The US invited China to join, but the latter country made it clear that it would not participate. Discussions continued between the US and Russia, with the US proposing a binding statement for Russia to sign. This would include an outline for a new treaty, which would cover all Russian nuclear weapons and expand the current monitoring and verification regime implemented by New START, with the goal of bringing China into a future treaty.

In mid-October, Putin proposed to "extend the current agreement without any pre-conditions at least for one year", but Trump rejected this. Subsequently, Russian officials agreed to a US proposal to freeze nuclear warhead production for a year and to extend the treaty by a year. US Department of State spokesperson Morgan Ortagus stated that "We appreciate the Russian Federation's willingness to make progress on the issue of nuclear arms control" and that the US was "prepared to meet immediately to finalize a verifiable agreement".

=== 2021 ===
On the day of Joe Biden's inauguration, Russia urged the new U.S. administration to take a "more constructive" approach in talks over the extension of the New START, with the Russian foreign ministry accusing the Trump administration of "deliberately and intentionally" dismantling international arms control agreements and referring to its "counterproductive and openly aggressive" approach in talks. The Biden administration said that it would seek a five-year extension of the treaty, which was then set to expire in February 2021. On 26 January, Biden and Putin agreed in a phone call that they would extend the treaty by five years.

Russian spokesman Dmitry Peskov replied that his country "stands for extending the treaty" and is waiting to see the details of the US proposal. On 27 January, the Russian State Duma voted to ratify the extension. On 3 February, five days after Putin signed this legislation, Secretary of State Antony Blinken announced that the U.S. had formally agreed to extend the treaty for five years, until 2026.

=== 2022 ===
In November 2022, The Russian Foreign Ministry postponed a meeting with the U.S. meant to discuss resuming New START inspections. The US State Department responded that they were "ready to reschedule at the earliest possible date as resuming inspections is a priority for sustaining the treaty as an instrument of stability." The Russian Foreign Ministry did not give a reason for the delay, although the relations between the United States and Russia became critically strained after Russia's full-scale invasion of Ukraine in February 2022.

== Suspension and aftermath ==
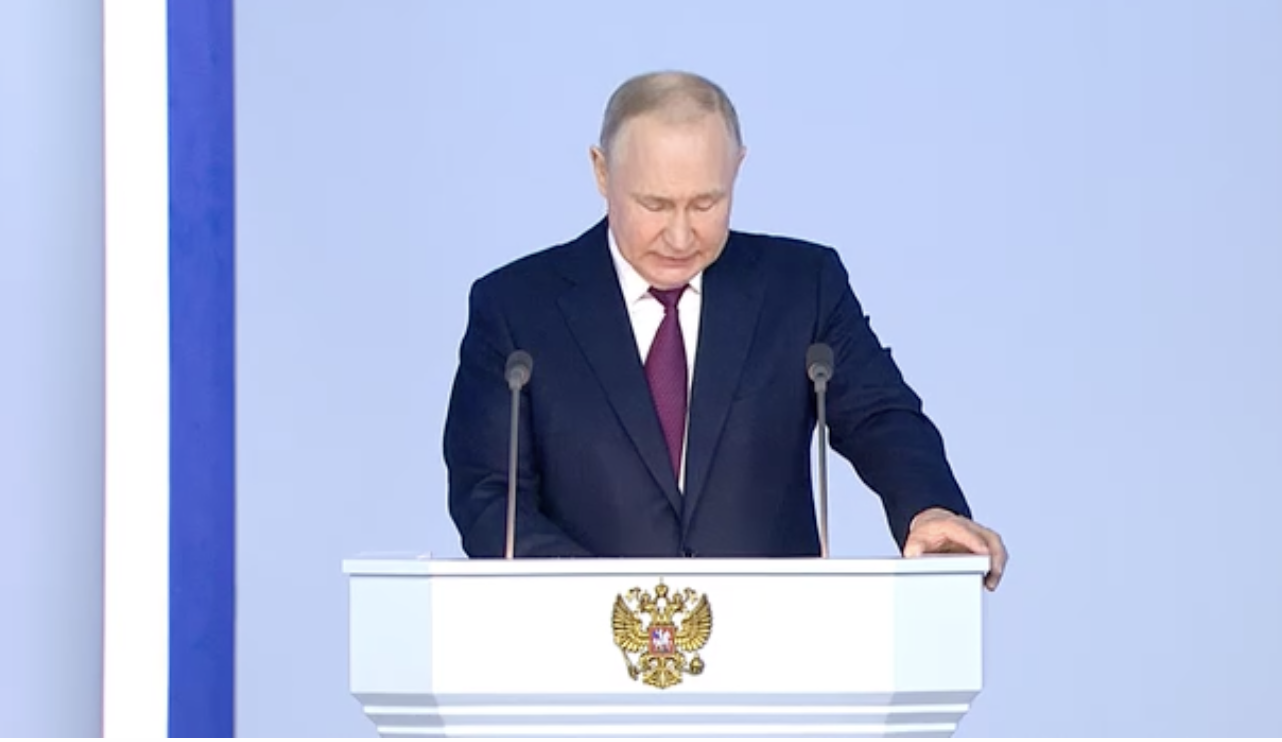
Vladimir Putin announcing the plans to suspend Russia's participation in the New START treaty during his February 2023 speech

On 21 February 2023, during the Presidential Address to the Federal Assembly, Vladimir Putin announced the suspension of Russia's participation in the New START treaty, saying that Russia would not allow the US and NATO to inspect its nuclear facilities. He claimed the United States was continuing to develop new nuclear weapons, and warned that any nuclear weapons tests conducted by the Americans would be countered by Russia developing and testing its own. Putin also complained that French and British nuclear weapons are not covered by the treaty. Sergei Markov, director of the Russian Institute for Political Studies, said, "If Washington does not listen to Moscow now, this is Putin's warning that he may withdraw [altogether] from the treaty. In a few years, there could be a colossal change that would catastrophically reduce U.S. nuclear security."

On 21 February, U.S. Secretary of State Antony Blinken said that the Russian president's decision "is both really unfortunate and very irresponsible," while Jens Stoltenberg, the Secretary General of NATO said, "I strongly encourage Russia to reconsider its decision and to respect existing agreements."

On 22 February, a senior defence official from Russia announced that Russia would stick to agreed limits on nuclear missiles and keep informing the United States about changes in its deployments.

On 29 March, Sergey Ryabkov announced the discontinuation of the notification process: "There will be no notifications at all... All notifications, all kinds of notifications, all activities under the treaty will be suspended and will not be conducted regardless of what position the U.S. may take." The same day the Russian Ministry of Defence reported that it "has begun exercises with its Yars intercontinental ballistic missile system and several thousand troops".

On 30 March, Sergey Ryabkov announced that "Moscow would continue to notify the United States of any intercontinental or submarine ballistic missile launches despite suspending the last remaining nuclear arms control treaty between the two countries" based on the Intermediate-Range Nuclear Forces Treaty from 1988: "Ryabkov said Russia, despite the suspension, had pledged to stick to the warhead limits and would also continue to implement a 1988 agreement on the exchange of missile launch notifications".

On 2 June, the United States revoked visas of Russian nuclear inspectors, describing this step as a "lawful countermeasure" to Russia's "ongoing violations" of the treaty.

== Expiration ==
Under its provisions, New START could not be extended beyond 5 February 2026. In September 2025, Vladimir Putin stated that Russia would be prepared to continue observing the treaty's limits for up to one year after its expiration, until 5 February 2027, provided the United States made a reciprocal commitment and refrained from actions that, in Russia's view, would undermine the strategic balance, including the expansion of missile defense.

The United States did not issue a formal response accepting or rejecting the proposal. President Donald Trump commented positively on the idea of nuclear restraint in late 2025 but did not commit to continued compliance with New START limits. In January 2026, he indicated that the treaty's expiration was not a priority and that a new agreement could be negotiated.

Russian officials warned that the expiration of New START without a replacement would increase strategic risks, as it would leave the United States and Russia without a legally binding agreement that limited and provided transparency over their strategic nuclear arsenals. On 4 February 2026, the Russian Ministry of Foreign Affairs stated that, in the absence of a formal U.S. response, Russia considered the treaty's obligations no longer binding and would determine its future actions based on the evolving strategic environment, while remaining open to future diplomatic engagement under appropriate conditions.

=== International reactions ===
Russian Ministry of Foreign Affairs stated that the Russian Federation "intends to act responsibly and with restraint" and warned that Russia is prepared to take "decisive countermeasures" if its national security is threatened. U.S. Secretary of State Marco Rubio called for a new treaty to be concluded with China's participation.

UN Secretary-General António Guterres urged the United States and Russia to immediately conclude a new nuclear arms control treaty. Pope Leo XIV called on the treaty parties to do everything possible to prevent a new arms race.

== Proposed Post–New START Treaty ==
After the expiration of New START in February 2026, the Trump administration stated that a new nuclear arms control treaty should include China. It was reported that for months prior to the expiration of New START, the Pentagon had been holding regular meetings to determine what that new treaty should look like. The efforts are likely to be further complicated with Moscow's insistence in recent years that any new arms control treaty should also include the United Kingdom and France.

== See also ==
- 2010 NPT Review Conference
- Strategic Arms Limitation Talks (SALT I and II)
- Treaty of Moscow (2002)
- Russia–United States relations
