= Foreign policy of the Truman administration =

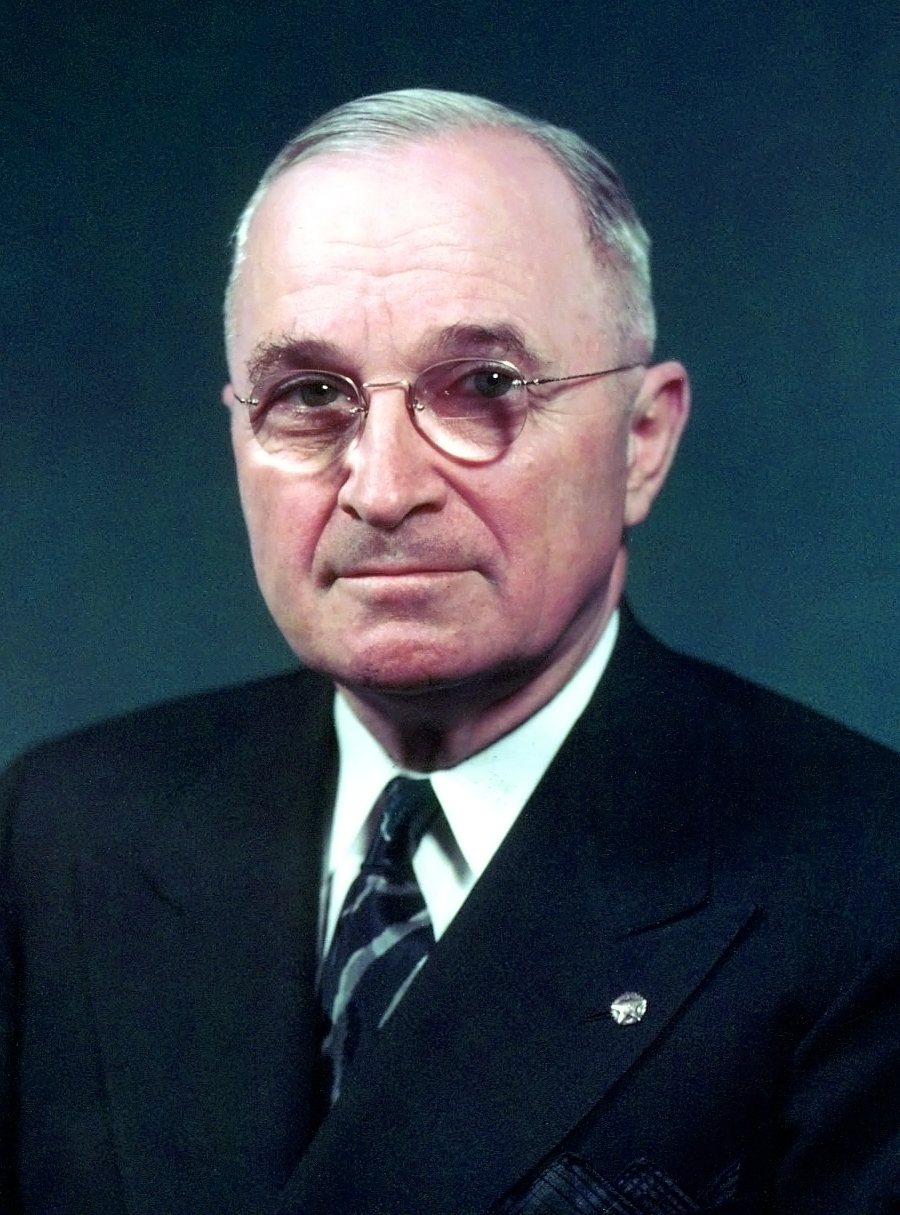
President Harry S. Truman directed U.S. foreign policy from 1945 to 1953. His main advisor was Dean Acheson.

The main issues of the United States foreign policy during the 1945–1953 presidency of Harry S. Truman include:

- Final stages of World War II included the challenge of defeating Japan with minimal American casualties. Truman asked Moscow to invade from the north, and decided to drop two atomic bombs.
- Post-war Reconstruction: Following the end of World War II, Truman faced the task of rebuilding Europe and Japan. He implemented the Marshall Plan to provide economic aid to Europe and Washington supervised the reconstruction of Japan.
- Formation of the United Nations: Truman played a key role in the formation of the United Nations, which was established in 1945 to promote international cooperation and prevent another world war. Because of the Soviet veto, it was ineffective in most major disputes.
- Cold War: Truman led the nation into the Cold War in 1947, a period of heightened tensions and rivalry between the United States and the Soviet Union. Truman helped form the NATO military alliance. He implemented the policy of containment, which aimed to stop the spread of communism and limit Soviet influence around the world.
- Korean War: In 1950, North Korea invaded South Korea, leading to a bloody conflict that lasted until 1953. Truman authorized U.S. military intervention in the conflict, which led to a protracted and costly war. He rejected the advice of General Douglas MacArthur, and fired him in 1951.
- Nuclear arms race: Truman made the decision to build the hydrogen bomb. He oversaw the development of the U.S. nuclear arsenal and the start of the nuclear arms race with the Soviet Union, which had far-reaching implications for U.S. foreign policy.

Taking office in April 1945 in the last stages of winning World War II, Truman worked with the main American Allies, especially Britain, the Soviet Union and China. He distrusted the Soviets. The challenges were to achieve victory over Germany and Japan; deal with the chaos in Europe and Asia in the aftermath of World War II; handle the beginning of the Cold War with the USSR; and launch new international organizations such as the United Nations and the World Bank. Truman's presidency was a turning point in foreign affairs, as the United States engaged in a liberal internationalist foreign policy and renounced isolationism by engaging in a long global conflict with the Soviet Union and its allies, forming NATO, and fighting China in the Korean War to a deadlock.

Truman took office upon the death of Franklin D. Roosevelt during the final months of war. Until then Truman had little interest in foreign affairs and no knowledge of Roosevelt's plans. He relied heavily on advisers like George Marshall and Dean Acheson, both of whom served as Secretary of State. Germany surrendered days after Truman took office, but Japan initially refused to surrender or negotiate. In order to force Japan's surrender without resorting to an invasion of the main Japanese islands, Truman approved of plans to drop atomic bombs on two Japanese cities. Even before Germany and Japan surrendered, the Truman administration worked with Moscow, London and other Allies to establish post-war international institutions and agreements. Most hope was placed in the United Nations until Moscow's veto made it ineffective. In economics there was the International Refugee Organization, and the General Agreement on Tariffs and Trade. The Truman administration embarked on a policy of rebuilding democracy and the economy in Japan and West Germany. It acted practically alone in Japan, and with Moscow, London and Paris in Germany.

Tensions between the United States and the Soviet Union escalated after 1945, and by 1947 the two countries had entered a sustained period of geopolitical tension known as the Cold War. Truman adopted a policy of containment, in which the U.S. would attempt to prevent the spread of Communism but would not actively seek to regain territory already lost to Communism. He also announced the Truman Doctrine, a policy of aiding countries in danger of falling to Communism. Pursuant to this doctrine, Truman convinced Congress to provide an unprecedented aid package to Greece and Turkey, overcoming opposition from isolationists and some on the left who favored more conciliatory policies towards the Soviet Union. The following year, Truman convinced Congress to approve the Marshall Plan, $13 billion aid package enacted to rebuild Western Europe. In 1949, the U.S., Canada, and several European countries signed the North Atlantic Treaty, establishing the NATO military alliance. Meanwhile, domestic fears of Soviet espionage led to a Red Scare and the rise of McCarthyism in the United States.

The Truman administration attempted to mediate the Chinese Civil War and failed. The Communist forces under Mao Zedong took control of Mainland China in 1949. In June 1950 Communist North Korea invaded South Korea in an attempt to reunify the country. Acting under the aegis of the United Nations, the U.S. intervened, defeated the invaders, and prepared to unify Korea UN terms. However, in late 1950 millions of Chinese soldiers entered Korea and pushed the allies back. The war settled into a stalemate along a line close to its starting point. Truman left office quite unpopular, but scholars generally consider him to be an above average president, and his administration has been credited for establishing Cold War policies that contained the Soviets.

== Leadership ==
Truman's 1951 foreign policy team

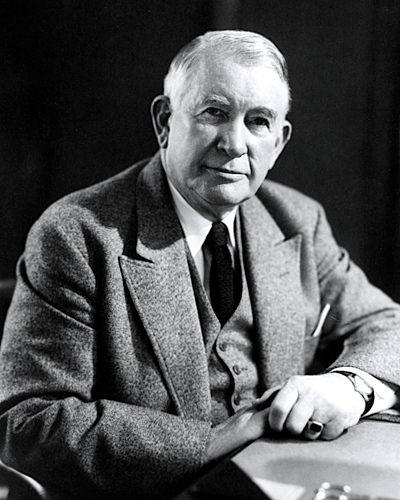
Alben W. Barkley

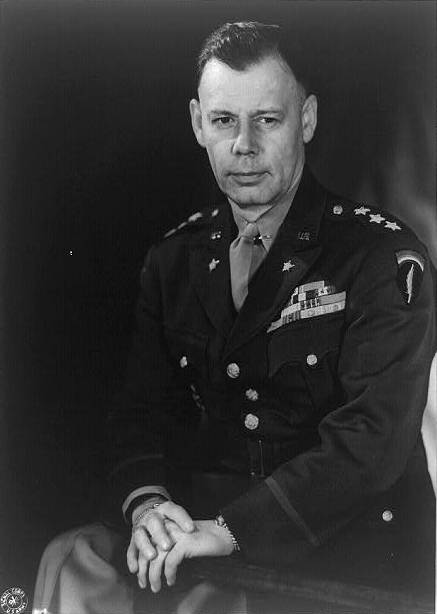
Walter Bedell Smith

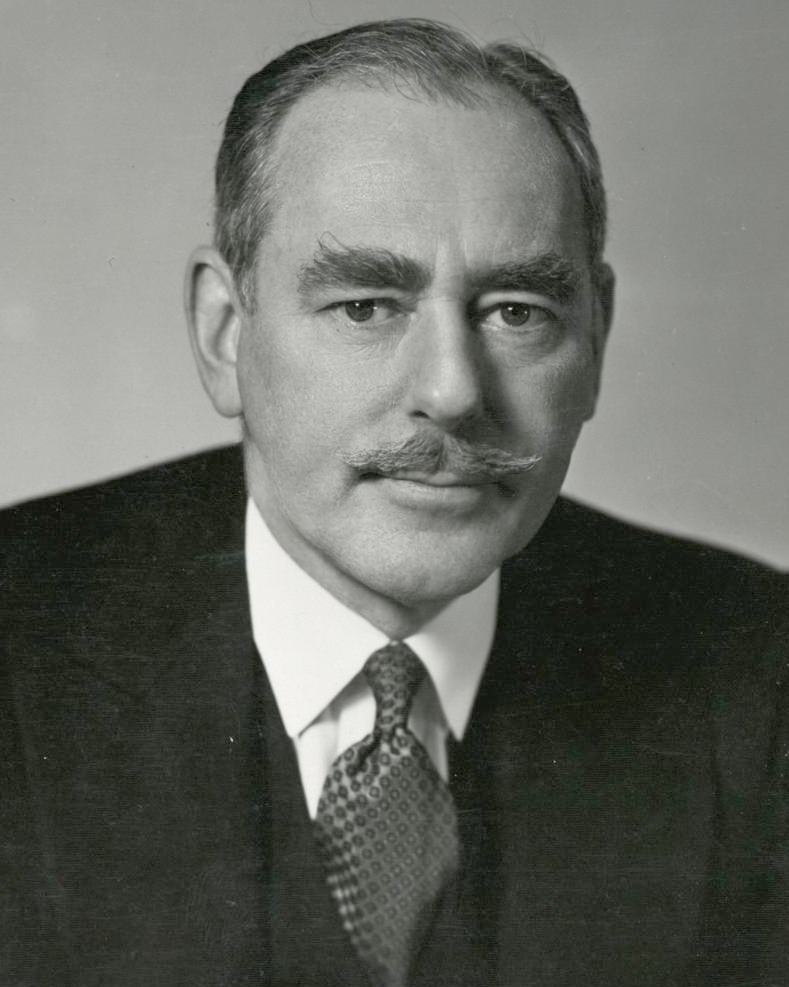
Dean Acheson

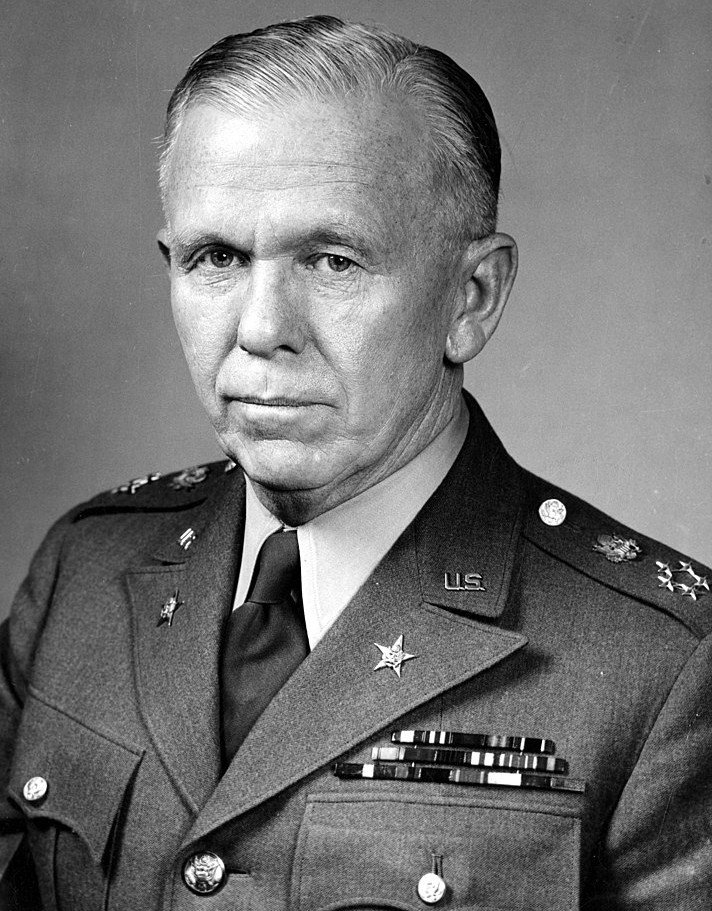
George C. Marshall

At first Truman kept all of Roosevelt's cabinet, but by late 1946 only one remained. Even as vice president, knowing of the president's poor health, he showed little curiosity about Roosevelt's postwar plans and was kept out of the loop. Furthermore, he had a small White House staff that knew little about diplomacy. As president he relied heavily on top officials from the State Department. Truman quickly replaced Secretary of State Edward Stettinius Jr. with James F. Byrnes, a personal friend from Senate days. By 1946, Truman was taking a hard line against the Kremlin, although Byrnes was still trying to be conciliatory. The divergence in policy was intolerable. Truman replaced Byrnes with the highly prestigious five-star army general George Marshall in January 1947, despite Marshall's failure in negotiating a settlement in the Chinese Civil War. In 1947, James Forrestal became the first Secretary of Defense, with his department overseeing all three branches of the United States Armed Forces. Mental illness sent Forrestal into retirement in 1949, and he was replaced successively by Louis A. Johnson who did poorly. Then came Marshall, and finally Robert A. Lovett.

At the Department of State, the key person was Dean Acheson, who replaced Marshall as secretary in 1949. The Marshall Plan embodied Acheson's analysis of the European crisis; he designed America's role. As tensions mounted with Moscow, Acheson moved from guarded optimism to pessimism. He decided negotiations were futile, and the United States had to mobilize a network of allies to resist the Kremlin's quest for world domination, using both military and especially economic power. Downplaying the importance of communism in China, Acheson emphasized Europe, and took the lead, as soon as he became Secretary of State in January 1949, to nail down the NATO alliance. It worked closely with the major European powers, as well as cooperating closely with Republican Senator Arthur Vandenberg, building bipartisan support at a time when the Republican Party controlled Congress after the 1946 midterms. According to Townsend Hoopes, throughout his long career, Acheson displayed:

exceptional intellectual power and purpose, and tough inner fiber. He projected the long lines and aristocratic bearing of the thoroughbred horse, a self-assured grace, an acerbic elegance of mind, and a charm whose chief attraction was perhaps its penetrating candor. ... [He] was swift-flowing and direct. ... Acheson was perceived as an 18th-century rationalist ready to apply an irreverent wit to matters public and private.

The American occupation of Japan was nominally an Allied endeavor, but in practice it was run by General Douglas MacArthur, with little or no consultation with the Allies or with Washington. His responsibilities were enlarged to include the Korean War, till he broke with Truman on policy issues and was fired in highly dramatic fashion in 1951. Policy for the occupation of West Germany was much less controversial, and the decisions were made in Washington, with Truman himself making the key decision to rebuild West Germany as an economic power.

Roosevelt had handled all foreign policy decisions on his own, with a few advisors such as Harry Hopkins, He helped Truman too, even though he was dying of cancer. Roosevelt's final Secretary of State, Edward R. Stettinius was an amiable businessman who succeeded at reorganization of the department, and spent most of his attention in the creation of the United Nations. When that was accomplished, Truman replaced him with James F. Byrnes, whom Truman knew well from their Senate days together. Byrnes was more interested in domestic than foreign affairs. He was secretive, not telling Truman about major developments. Dean Acheson by this point was the number two person in State, and worked well with Truman. The president finally replaced Byrnes with Marshall. With the world in incredibly complex turmoil, international travel was essential. Byrnes spent 62% of his time abroad; Marshall spent 47% and Acheson 25%.

== Winning World War II ==
By April 1945, the Allied Powers, led by the United States, Great Britain, and the Soviet Union, were close to defeating Germany, but Japan remained a formidable adversary in the Pacific War. As vice president, Truman had been uninformed about major initiatives relating to the war, including the top-secret Manhattan Project, which was about to test the world's first atomic bomb. Although Truman was told briefly on the afternoon of April 12 that the Allies had a new, highly destructive weapon, it was not until April 25 that Secretary of War Henry Stimson told him the details of the atomic bomb, which was almost ready. Germany surrendered on May 8, 1945, and Truman's attention turned to the Pacific, where he hoped to end the war as quickly, and with as little expense in lives or government funds, as possible.

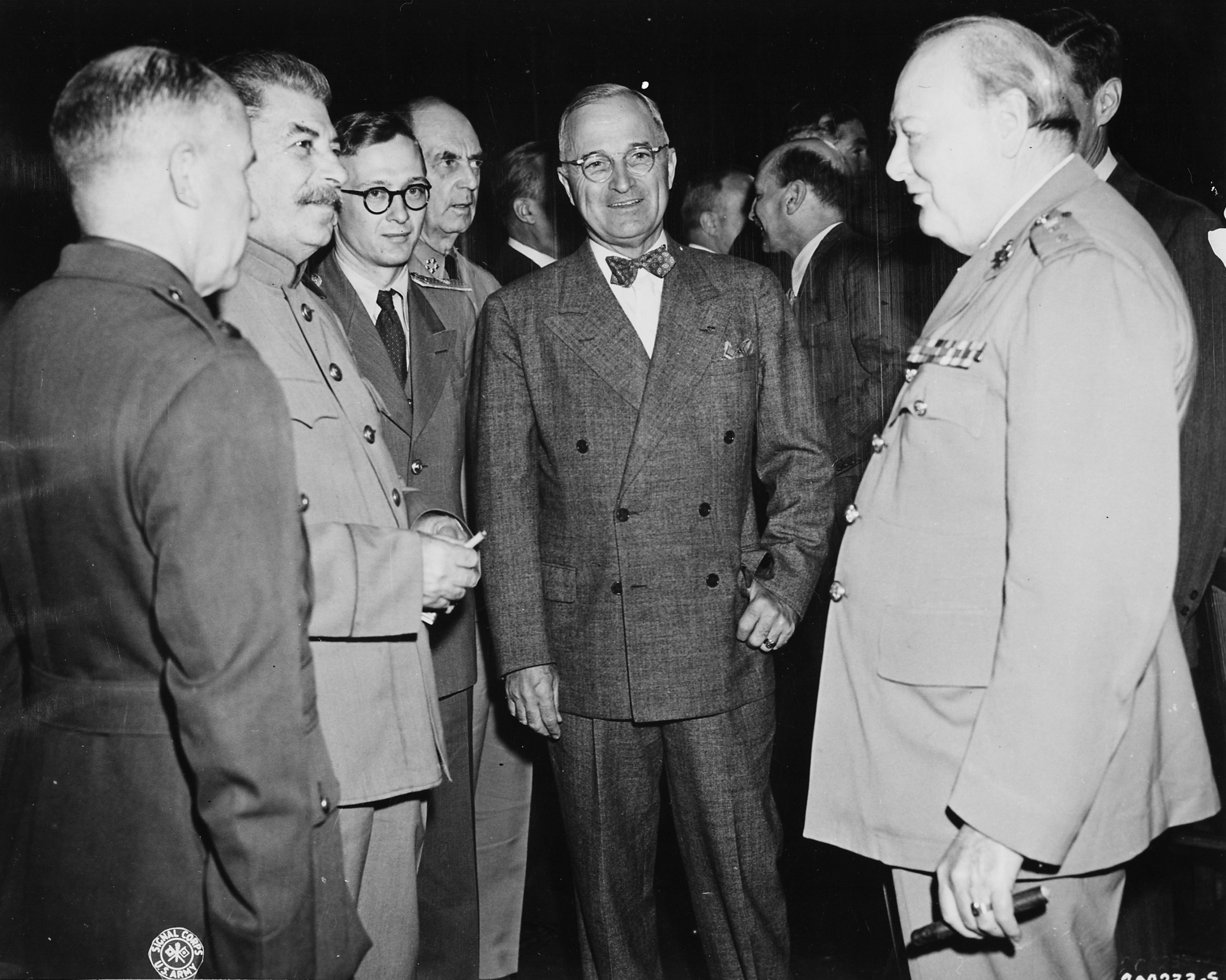
Joseph Stalin, Harry S. Truman, and Winston Churchill in Potsdam, July 1945

With the end of the war drawing near, Truman flew to Berlin for the Potsdam Conference, to meet with Soviet leader Joseph Stalin and British leader Winston Churchill regarding the post-war order. Several major decisions were made at the Potsdam Conference: Germany would be divided into four occupation zones (among the three powers and France), the Germany–Poland border was to be shifted west to the Oder–Neisse line, the Soviet-backed Provisional Government of National Unity was recognized as the legitimate government of Poland, and Vietnam was to be partitioned at the 16th parallel. The Soviet Union also agreed to launch an invasion of Japanese-held Manchuria. While at the Potsdam Conference, Truman was informed that the Trinity test of the first atomic bomb on July 16 had been successful. He hinted to Stalin that the U.S. was about to use a new kind of weapon against the Japanese. Though this was the first time the Soviets had been officially given information about the atomic bomb, Stalin was already aware of the bomb project, having learned about it through espionage long before Truman did.

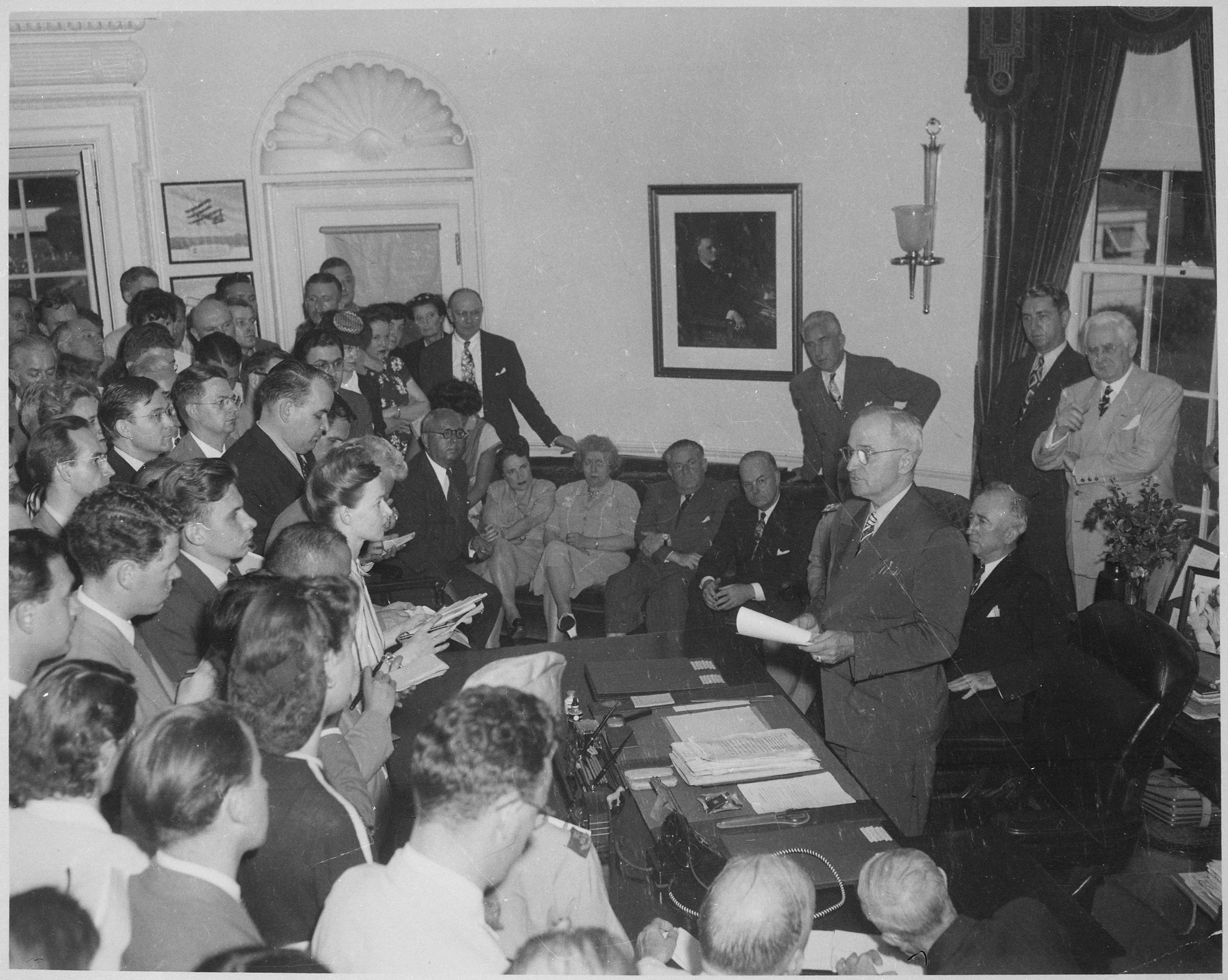
Truman announces Japan's surrender. Washington, DC, August 14, 1945

In August 1945, the Japanese government ignored surrender demands as specified in the Potsdam Declaration. With the support of most of his aides, Truman approved the schedule of the military's plans to drop atomic bombs on the Japanese cities of Hiroshima and Nagasaki. Hiroshima was bombed on August 6, and Nagasaki three days later, leaving approximately 135,000 dead; another 130,000 would die from radiation sickness and other bomb-related illnesses in the following five years. Japan agreed to surrender on August 10, on the sole condition that Emperor Hirohito would not be forced to abdicate; after some internal debate, the Truman administration accepted these terms of surrender.

The decision to drop atomic bombs on Hiroshima and Nagasaki provoked long-running debates. Supporters of the bombings argue that, given the tenacious Japanese defense of the outlying islands, the bombings saved hundreds of thousands of lives that would have been lost invading mainland Japan. After leaving office, Truman told a journalist that the atomic bombing "was done to save 125,000 youngsters on the American side and 125,000 on the Japanese side from getting killed and that is what it did. It probably also saved a half million youngsters on both sides from being maimed for life." Truman was also motivated by a desire to end the war before the Soviet Union could invade Japanese-held territories and set up Communist governments. Critics have argued that the use of nuclear weapons was unnecessary, given that conventional tactics such as firebombing and blockade might induce Japan's surrender without the need for such weapons.

== Postwar international order ==
Truman at first was committed to following Roosevelt's policies and priorities. However he soon replaced Roosevelt's top appointments and put in his own people. In 1945 public opinion was demanding immediate demobilization of the troops. The Administration's policies were designed to benefit individuals, regardless of the damage it did when experienced military units lost their longest-serving and most experience soldiers. Truman refused to consider keeping an army in Europe for the purpose of neutralizing Stalin's expansion. While his State Department was taking an increasingly hard line, the War Department took a more conciliatory position. It refused to allocate additional forces to Europe. In practice, the American forces were removed from Europe as fast as possible.

By 1946, however, Truman had changed. He was now distrustful of Stalin and alarmed about Soviet pressures on Iran and Poland. He was disappointed with the UN. Truman now accepted more and more advice from the State Department and was moving rapidly toward a hard-line, Cold War position. The Soviet Union had become the enemy.

=== United Nations ===
When Truman took office, several international organizations that were designed to help prevent future wars and international economic crises were in the process of being established. Chief among those organizations was the United Nations, one of Roosevelt's highest priorities. The UN was designed as an intergovernmental organization similar to the defunct League of Nations without its faults. It was designed to help ensure international cooperation under the control of the U.S., USSR, Britain, France and China, each of which could veto a decision. When Truman took office, delegates were about to meet at the United Nations Conference on International Organization in San Francisco. As a Wilsonian internationalist, Truman strongly supported the creation of the United Nations, and he signed United Nations Charter at the San Francisco Conference. Truman did not repeat Woodrow Wilson's partisan attempt to ratify the Treaty of Versailles in 1919. Instead he cooperating closely with Senator Arthur H. Vandenberg and other Republican leaders to ensure ratification. Cooperation with Vandenberg, a leading figure on the Senate Foreign Relations Committee, proved to be crucial for Truman's foreign policy, especially after Republicans gained control of Congress in 1946. Construction of the United Nations headquarters in New York City was funded by the Rockefeller Foundation and completed in 1952.

=== Trade and tariffs ===
In 1934, a Democratic Congress passed the Reciprocal Tariff Act, giving the Administration an unprecedented amount of authority in setting tariff rates. The Republicans had raised the tariffs to a high levels that dramatically reduced imports and exports. The act allowed for the creation of reciprocal agreements in which the U.S. and other countries mutually agreed to lower tariff rates. Despite significant opposition from those who favored higher tariffs, Truman was able to win legislative extension of the reciprocity program, and his administration reached numerous bilateral agreements that lowered trade barriers. The Truman administration also sought to further lower global tariff rates by engaging in multilateral trade negotiations, and the State Department proposed the establishment of the International Trade Organization (ITO). The ITO was designed to have broad powers to regulate trade among member countries, and its charter was approved by the United Nations in 1948. However, the ITO's broad powers engendered opposition in Congress, and Truman declined to send the charter to the Senate for ratification. In the course of creating the ITO, the U.S. and 22 other countries signed the General Agreement on Tariffs and Trade (GATT), a set of principles governing trade policy. Under the terms of the agreement, each country agreed to reduce overall tariff rates and to treat each co-signatory as a "most favoured nation", meaning that no non-signatory country could benefit from more advantageous tariff rates. Due to a combination of the Reciprocal Tariff Act, the GATT, and inflation, American tariff rates fell dramatically between the passage of the Smoot–Hawley Tariff Act in 1930 and the end of the Truman administration in 1953.

=== Refugees ===
World War II left millions of refugees displaced in Europe. To help address this problem, Truman backed the founding of the International Refugee Organization (IRO), a temporary international organization that helped resettle refugees. The United States also funded temporary camps and admitted large numbers of refugees as permanent residents. Truman obtained ample funding from Congress for the Displaced Persons Act of 1948, which allowed many of the displaced people of World War II to immigrate into the United States. Of the approximately one million people resettled by the IRO, more than 400,000 settled in the United States.

The most contentious issue was the resettlement of European Jewish refugees. Truman at first followed the State Department policy of friendship with the Arabs and agreement with the British opposition to Jewish entry into Palestine. However Truman's close links to the pro-Zionist elements in the Jewish community led him to reverse positions and overrule the State Department. He urged London to admit 100,000 displaced Jews in British-controlled Mandatory Palestine and strongly supported the new state of Israel.

The Administration helped created a new category of refugee, the "escapee", at the 1951 Geneva Convention Relating to the Status of Refugees. The American Escapee Program began in 1952 to help the flight and relocation of political refugees from communism in Eastern Europe. The motivation for the refugee and escapee programs was twofold: humanitarianism, and use as a political weapon against inhumane communism. The State Department's Policy Planning Staff worked with Hollywood to publicize death-defying refugee escapes as an anti-Communist theme in movies. However many escapees had been active in the Communist parties, and they were not allowed into the U.S. under the McCarran Internal Security Act of 1950 and the Immigration and Nationality Act of 1952.

=== Atomic energy and weaponry ===
In March 1946, at an optimistic moment for postwar cooperation, the administration released the Acheson-Lilienthal Report, which proposed that all nations voluntarily abstain from constructing nuclear weapons. As part of the proposal, the U.S. would dismantle its nuclear program once all other countries agreed not to develop or otherwise acquire nuclear weapons. Fearing that Congress would reject the proposal, Truman turned to the well-connected Bernard Baruch to represent the American position to the United Nations. The Baruch Plan, largely based on the Acheson-Lilienthal Report, was not adopted due to opposition from Congress and the Soviet Union. The Soviet Union would develop its own nuclear arsenal, testing a nuclear weapon for the first time in August 1949.

The United States Atomic Energy Commission, directed by David E. Lilienthal until 1950, was in charge of designing and building nuclear weapons under a policy of full civilian control. The U.S. had only 9 atomic bombs in 1946, but the stockpile grew to 650 by 1951. Lilienthal wanted to give high priority to peaceful uses for nuclear technology, especially nuclear power plants, but coal was cheap and the power industry was largely uninterested in building nuclear power plants during the Truman administration. Construction of the first nuclear plant would not begin until 1954. In early 1950, Truman authorized the development of thermonuclear weapons, a more powerful version of atomic bombs. Truman's decision to develop thermonuclear weapons faced opposition from many liberals and some government officials, but he believed that the Soviet Union would likely develop the weapons and was unwilling to allow the Soviets to have such an advantage. The first test of thermonuclear weaponry was conducted by the United States in 1952; the Soviet Union would perform its own thermonuclear test in August 1953.

== Beginning of the Cold War, 1945–1950 ==
World War II upset the international system, leaving only the United States and the Soviet Union as the major powers. Initially, Truman hoped to work with the Soviets, but their consolidation of control in Eastern Europe and the Soviet five-year plan strained relations. Truman was reluctant to break with the Soviet Union at first, but tensions rose in places like Iran, Turkey, and Germany, and Truman became convinced that the Soviet Union sought world domination. He adopted a policy of containment, which aimed to prevent the further expansion of Soviet influence. Liberals led by Henry Wallace hoped for cooperative relations with the Soviet Union, but Truman increasingly took a hard line towards them throughout 1946, forcing Wallace's resignation from the cabinet.

In 1947, Truman announced the "Truman Doctrine" that implemented the containment policy to prevent the spread of communism. It started with providing aid to Greece and Turkey to prevent Soviet-aligned governments. Truman called for bipartisan support and won approval for an unprecedented $400 million aid package. The United States became involved in the Greek Civil War. It provided aid to the Christian Democrats during the 1948 Italian general election. The Truman Doctrine solidified the division between the US and the Soviet Union and led to the formation of the Eastern and Western Blocs. Some liberal Democrats opposed the Truman Doctrine, but Truman argued that American action was necessary for a "sound" peace. Additionally, a new policy was implemented in 1947 to forbid the sale of high technology to the Soviets.

To address new Cold War, Washington reorganized the military and intelligence establishment through the National Security Act of 1947. It created the National Military Establishment (later renamed the Department of Defense), separated the U.S. Air Force from the Army, and established the Central Intelligence Agency (CIA) and the National Security Council (NSC). The Act also institutionalized the Joint Chiefs of Staff and made the Secretary of Defense the chief presidential adviser on military matters. Truman also secretly created the National Security Agency (NSA) in 1952. However, despite hopes to reduce rivalries, the Army, Navy, and Air Force continued to battle over budgets and strategy. Truman's proposal to require one year of military service for young men did not gain significant support in Congress.

The Marshall Plan began in 1947-48 to help restore the European economy, modernize it, remove internal tariffs and barriers, and encourage European collaboration. It was funded by a multi-year, $25 billion appropriation from the Republican-controlled Congress, despite opposition from a conservative isolationist wing of the party. The plan helped European economies recover in the late 1940s and early 1950s, and provided critical psychological reassurance to war-torn countries. The European integration process led to the creation of the European Economic Community, which eventually formed the basis of the European Union.

In 1948, Stalin cut off all land traffic to Western-held sectors of Berlin in response to Western moves towards re-industrializing their German occupation zones. Stalin hoped to prevent the creation of a western German state aligned with the U.S. or to consolidate control over eastern Germany. General Lucius D. Clay proposed sending an armored column across the Soviet zone to West Berlin, but Truman believed this would risk war and approved the plan of Britain's Ernest Bevin to supply the blockaded city by air instead. The Allies initiated the Berlin Airlift on June 25, delivering food and other supplies using military aircraft. The airlift worked, and ground access was again granted on May 11, 1949. The Berlin Airlift was one of Truman's great foreign policy successes and aided his election campaign in 1948.

Rising tensions with the Soviets and the Soviet veto of UN Security Council resolutions led the US in 1949 to create an anti-Soviet military alliance called NATO. It aimed to contain Soviet expansion in Europe and assure France that the US would defend it, allowing for the re-establishment of an independent German state. The US passed the Mutual Defense Assistance Act to aid European allies, and Cold War tensions escalated after the Soviet acquisition of nuclear weapons and the Korean War. The US increased its commitment to NATO, invited Greece and Turkey to join, and stationed troops in Europe. NATO established a unified command structure, and West Germany joined in 1955.

In 1949, the US launched Point Four, a program to provide technological aid to developing countries with a $25 million budget. It later became the United States Agency for International Development. West Germany's rearmament in the early 1950s was strongly supported by the US military and weakly opposed by President Truman, with the outbreak of the Korean War in 1950 leading to full US support. The establishment of the Bundeswehr, the West German military, followed in 1955. In April 1950, the National Security Council approved NSC 68, calling for rapid rearmament and a more aggressive posture in the Cold War. The sudden outbreak of the Korean War confirmed the warning in NSC-68, leading to higher defense spending and a quadrupled budget between 1949 and 1953. Truman strongly disapproved of Spain, but its location and its anti-communism forced a reappraisal. Truman relented and sent an ambassador and made loans available. Military talks began and President Eisenhower established the Pact of Madrid, a security agreement, in 1953.

=== Escalating tensions, 1945–1946 ===
Following World War II, the United States, France, Britain, and the Soviet Union each took control of occupation zones in Germany and the German capital of Berlin

The Second World War dramatically upended the international system, as formerly-powerful nations like Germany, France, Japan, and even Britain had been devastated. At the end of the war, only the United States and the Soviet Union had the ability to exercise influence, and a bipolar international power structure replaced the multipolar structure of the Interwar period. On taking office, Truman privately viewed the Soviet Union as a "police government pure and simple", but he was initially reluctant to take a hard-line towards the Soviet Union, as he hoped to work with the Soviets in the aftermath of Second World War. Truman's suspicions deepened as the Soviets consolidated their control in Eastern Europe throughout 1945, and the February 1946 announcement of the Soviet five-year plan further strained relations as it called for the continuing build-up of the Soviet military. At the December 1945 Moscow Conference, Secretary of State Byrnes agreed to recognize the pro-Soviet governments in the Balkans, while the Soviet leadership accepted U.S. leadership in the occupation of Japan. U.S. concessions at the conference angered other members of the Truman administration, including Truman himself. By the beginning of 1946, it had become clear to Truman thatBritain and the United States would have little influence in Soviet-dominated Eastern Europe.

Former Vice President Henry Wallace, former First Lady Eleanor Roosevelt, and many other prominent Americans continued to hope for cooperative relations with the Soviet Union. Some liberals, like Reinhold Niebuhr, distrusted the Soviet Union but believed that the United States should not try to counter Soviet influence in Eastern Europe, which the Soviets saw as their "strategic security belt". Partly because of this sentiment, Truman was reluctant to fully break with the Soviet Union in early 1946, but he took an increasingly hard line towards the Soviet Union throughout the year. He personally approved of Winston Churchill's March 1946 "Iron Curtain" speech, which urged the United States to take the lead of an anti-Soviet alliance, though he did not publicly endorse it.

Throughout 1946, tensions arose between the United States and the Soviet Union in places like Iran, which the Soviets had occupied during World War II. Pressure from the U.S. and the United Nations finally forced the withdrawal of Soviet soldiers. Turkey also emerged as a point of contention, as the Soviet Union demanded joint control over the Dardanelles and the Bosphorus, key straits that controlled movement between the Black Sea and the Mediterranean Sea. The U.S. forcefully opposed this proposed alteration to the 1936 Montreux Convention, which had granted Turkey sole control over the straits, and Truman dispatched a fleet to the Eastern Mediterranean to show his administration's commitment to the region. The Soviet Union and the United States also clashed in Germany, which had been divided into four occupation zones. In the September 1946 Stuttgart speech, Secretary of State Byrnes announced that the United States would no longer seek reparations from Germany and would support the establishment of a democratic state. The United States, France, and Britain agreed to combine their occupation zones, eventually forming West Germany. In East Asia, Truman denied the Soviet request to reunify Korea, and refused to allow the Soviets a role in the post-war occupation of Japan.

By September 1946, Truman was convinced that the Soviet Union sought world domination and that cooperation was futile. He adopted a policy of containment, based on a 1946 cable by diplomat George F. Kennan. Containment, a policy of preventing the further expansion of Soviet influence, represented a middle-ground position between friendly détente (as represented by Wallace), and aggressive rollback to regain territory already lost to Communism, as would be adopted in 1981 by Ronald Reagan. Kennan's doctrine was based on the notion that the Soviet Union was led by an uncompromising totalitarian regime, and that the Soviets were primarily responsible for escalating tensions. Wallace, who had been appointed Secretary of Commerce after the 1944 presidential election, resigned from the cabinet in September 1946 due to Truman's hardening stance towards the Soviet Union.

=== Truman Doctrine ===
In the first major step in implementing containment, Truman gave money to Greece and Turkey to prevent the spread of Soviet-aligned governments. Prior to 1947, the U.S. had largely ignored Greece, which had an anti-communist government, because it was under British influence. Since 1944, the British had assisted the Greek government against a left-wing insurgency, but in early 1947 London informed Washington that it could no longer afford to intervene in Greece. At the urging of Acheson, who warned that the fall of Greece could lead to the expansion of Soviet influence throughout Europe, Truman requested that Congress grant an unprecedented $400 million aid package to Greece and Turkey. In a March 1947 speech before a joint session of Congress, written by Acheson, Truman articulated the Truman Doctrine. It called for the United States to support "free people who are resisting attempted subjugation by armed minorities or by outside pressures." Overcoming isolationists who opposed involvement, as well as those on the left who wanted cooperation with Moscow, Truman won bipartisan approval of the aid package. The congressional vote represented a permanent break with the non-interventionism that had characterized U.S. foreign policy prior to World War II.

The United States became closely involved in the Greek Civil War, which ended with the defeat of the insurgency in 1949. Stalin and Yugoslavian leader Josip Broz Tito both provided aid to the insurgents, but they fought for control causing a split in the Communist bloc. American military and economic aid to Turkey also proved effective, and Turkey avoided a civil war.

The Truman administration provided aid to the Christian Democrat government during the 1948 Italian general election where the Communist Party had strength. The aid package, combined with a covert CIA operation, anti-Communist mobilization by the Catholic Church and Italian Americans, helped to produce a Communist defeat.

The initiatives of the Truman Doctrine solidified the post-war division between the United States and the Soviet Union, and the Soviet Union responded by tightening its control over Eastern Europe. Countries aligned with the Soviet Union became known as the Eastern Bloc, while the U.S. and its allies became known as the Western Bloc.

Although the far left element in the Democratic Party and the Congress of Industrial Organizations was being expelled, some liberal Democrats opposed the Truman Doctrine. Eleanor Roosevelt wrote Truman in April 1947 calling him to rely on the UN instead of his Truman Doctrine. She denounced Greece and Turkey because they were undemocratic. Truman needing support from the Roosevelt's liberal wing, wrote her that while he held onto his long-term hopes for the United Nations, he insisted that and an "economically, ideologically and politically sound" peace would more likely come from American action, than from the UN. He emphasized the strategic geographical importance of the Greek-Turkish land bridge as a critical point in which democratic forces could stop the advance of communism that had so ravaged Eastern Europe.

A new policy in 1947 was to forbid the sale to the Soviet bloc (and China after 1949) of high technology that had military uses. Washington convinced its allies to follow suit. Richard Nixon finally relaxed the policy in 1970.

=== Military reorganization and budgets ===
U.S. military spending
Fiscal Year	% GNP
1945	38%
1946	21%
1948	5%
1950	4.6%
1952	13%

Facing new, global challenges, Washington reorganized the military and intelligence establishment to provide for more centralized control and reduce rivalries. The National Security Act of 1947 merged the Department of War and the Department of the Navy into the National Military Establishment (which was later renamed as the Department of Defense). The law also separated the U.S. Air Force from the Army. It created the Central Intelligence Agency (CIA), and the National Security Council (NSC). The CIA and the NSC were designed to be civilian bodies that would increase U.S. preparation against foreign threats without assuming the domestic functions of the Federal Bureau of Investigation. The National Security Act institutionalized the Joint Chiefs of Staff, which had been established on a temporary basis during World War II. The Joint Chiefs of Staff took charge of all military action, and the Secretary of Defense became the chief presidential adviser on military matter. In 1952, Truman secretly consolidated and empowered the cryptologic elements of the United States by creating the National Security Agency (NSA). Truman also sought to require one year of military service for all young men physically capable of such service, but this proposal never won more than modest support among members of Congress.

Truman had hoped that the National Security Act would minimize interservice rivalries, but the Army, Navy and Air Force each retained considerable autonomy and battled over budgets and strategy. In 1949, Secretary of Defense Louis Johnson announced that he would cancel a "supercarrier", which the United States Navy wanted as a key weapon for the future. The cancellation sparked the "Revolt of the Admirals", when a number of retired and active-duty admirals publicly disagreed with the administration's emphasis on less expensive strategic atomic bombs delivered by the Air Force. During congressional hearings, public opinion shifted strongly against the Navy, which ultimately kept control of Marine aviation but lost control over strategic bombing. Military budgets following the hearings prioritized the development of Air Force heavy bomber designs, and the United States accumulated a combat ready force of over 1,000 long-range strategic bombers capable of supporting nuclear mission scenarios.

Truman gave a low priority to the defense budget—it got whatever money was left over after tax cuts and domestic spending. From the beginning, he assumed that the American monopoly on the atomic bomb was adequate protection against any and all external threats. Military spending plunged from 39% of GNP in 1945 to only 5% in 1948. The number of military personnel fell from just over 3 million in 1946 to approximately 1.6 million in 1947, although the number was still nearly five times larger than that of U.S. military in 1939. In 1949, Truman ordered a review of U.S. military policies in light of the Soviet Union's acquisition of nuclear weapons.

=== Marshall Plan ===
Marshall Plan expenditures by country

The Marshall Plan was launched by the United States in 1947–1948 to replace numerous ad hoc loan and grant programs, with a unified, long-range plan to help restore the European economy, modernize it, remove internal tariffs and barriers, and encourage European collaboration. It was funded by the Republican -controlled Congress, where the isolationist Republican element was overwhelmed by a new internationalism. Stalin refused to let any of his satellite nations in Eastern Europe participate. Much less famous was a similar aid program aimed at Japan, China and other Asian countries. All the money was donated – there was no repayment needed. (At the same time, however, there were also separate American government loan programs that did require repayment.)

The United States had suddenly terminated the war-time Lend-Lease program in August 1945, to the surprise and distress of Britain, the Soviet Union and other recipients who had counted on a steady flow. However the United States did send large sums and loans and relief supplies, though in an uncoordinated fashion with no long-term plan. Western Europe was slowly recovering by 1947; Eastern Europe was being stripped of its resources by Moscow. Churchill warned that Europe was "a rubble heap, a charnel house, a breeding ground for pestilence and hate". American leaders feared that poor economic conditions could lead to Communism in France and Italy, where the far left was under Stalin's control. With the goal of containing Communism and increasing trade between the U.S. and Europe, the Truman administration devised the Marshall Plan. Dean Acheson was the key planner, But Marshall's enormous worldwide prestige was used to sell the program at home and abroad.

To fund the Marshall Plan, Truman asked Congress to approve an unprecedented, multi-year, $25 billion appropriation. Congress, under the control of conservative Republicans, agreed to fund the program for multiple reasons. The 20-member conservative isolationist wing of the Republican Party, based in the rural Midwest, was led by Senator Kenneth S. Wherry. He argued that it would be "a wasteful 'operation rat-hole'"; that it made no sense to oppose communism by supporting socialist governments; and that American goods would reach Russia and increase its war potential. The isolationist bloc opposed loans or financial aid of any sort to Europe, opposed NATO, and tried to void presidential power to send troops to Europe. Their political base included many German-American and Scandinavian American communities that had suffered nasty attacks on their American patriotism during World War I. No matter what the issue, they could be counted on as vocal enemies of the Truman administration. The isolationists were outmaneuvered by the emerging internationalist wing in the Republican Party, led by Michigan Senator Arthur H. Vandenberg.

With support from Republican Senator Henry Cabot Lodge, Jr., Vandenberg admitted there was no certainty that the plan would succeed, but said it would halt economic chaos, sustain Western civilization, and stop further Soviet expansion. Senator Robert A. Taft, a leading conservative Republican who was generally skeptical of American commitments in Europe, chose to focus on domestic issues and deferred to Vandenberg on foreign policy. Major newspapers were highly supportive, including pro-business conservative outlets like Time magazine. Both houses of Congress approved the initial appropriation, known as the Foreign Assistance Act, by large majorities, and Truman signed the act into law in April 1948. Congress would eventually allocate $12.4 billion in aid over the four years of the plan.

A new Washington agency the European Recovery Program (ERP) ran the Marshall Plan and close cooperation with the recipient nations. The money proved decisive, but the ERP was focused on a longer-range vision that included more efficiency, more high technology, and the removal of multiple internal barriers and tariffs inside Western Europe. ERP allowed each recipient to develop its own plan for the aid, it set several rules and guidelines on the use of the funding. Governments were required to exclude Communists, socialist policies were allowed, and balanced budgets were favored. Additionally, the ERP conditioned aid to the French and British on their acceptance of the reindustrialization of Germany and support for European integration. The Soviets set up their own program for aid, the Molotov Plan, and the new barriers reduced trade between the Eastern bloc and the Western bloc.

The Marshall Plan helped European economies recover in the late 1940s and early 1950s. By 1952, industrial productivity had increased by 35% compared to 1938 levels. The Marshall Plan also provided critical psychological reassurance to many Europeans, restoring optimism to a war-torn continent. Though European countries did not adopt American economic structures and ideas to the degree hoped for by some Americans, they remained firmly rooted in mixed economic systems. The European integration process led to the creation of the European Economic Community, which eventually formed the basis of the European Union.

=== Berlin airlift ===
In reaction to Western moves aimed at reindustrializing their German occupation zones, Stalin ordered a blockade of the Western-held sectors of Berlin, which was deep in the Soviet occupation zone. Stalin hoped to prevent the creation of a western German state aligned with the U.S., or, failing that, to consolidate control over eastern Germany. After the blockade began on June 24, 1948, the commander of the American occupation zone in Germany, General Lucius D. Clay, proposed sending a large armored column across the Soviet zone to West Berlin with instructions to defend itself if it were stopped or attacked. Truman believed this would entail an unacceptable risk of war, and instead approved Ernest Bevin's plan to supply the blockaded city by air. On June 25, the Allies initiated the Berlin Airlift, a campaign that delivered food and other supplies, such as coal, using military aircraft on a massive scale. Nothing like it had ever been attempted before, and no single nation had the capability, either logistically or materially, to accomplish it. The airlift worked, and ground access was again granted on May 11, 1949. The Berlin Airlift was one of Truman's great foreign policy successes, and it significantly aided his election campaign in 1948.

=== NATO ===
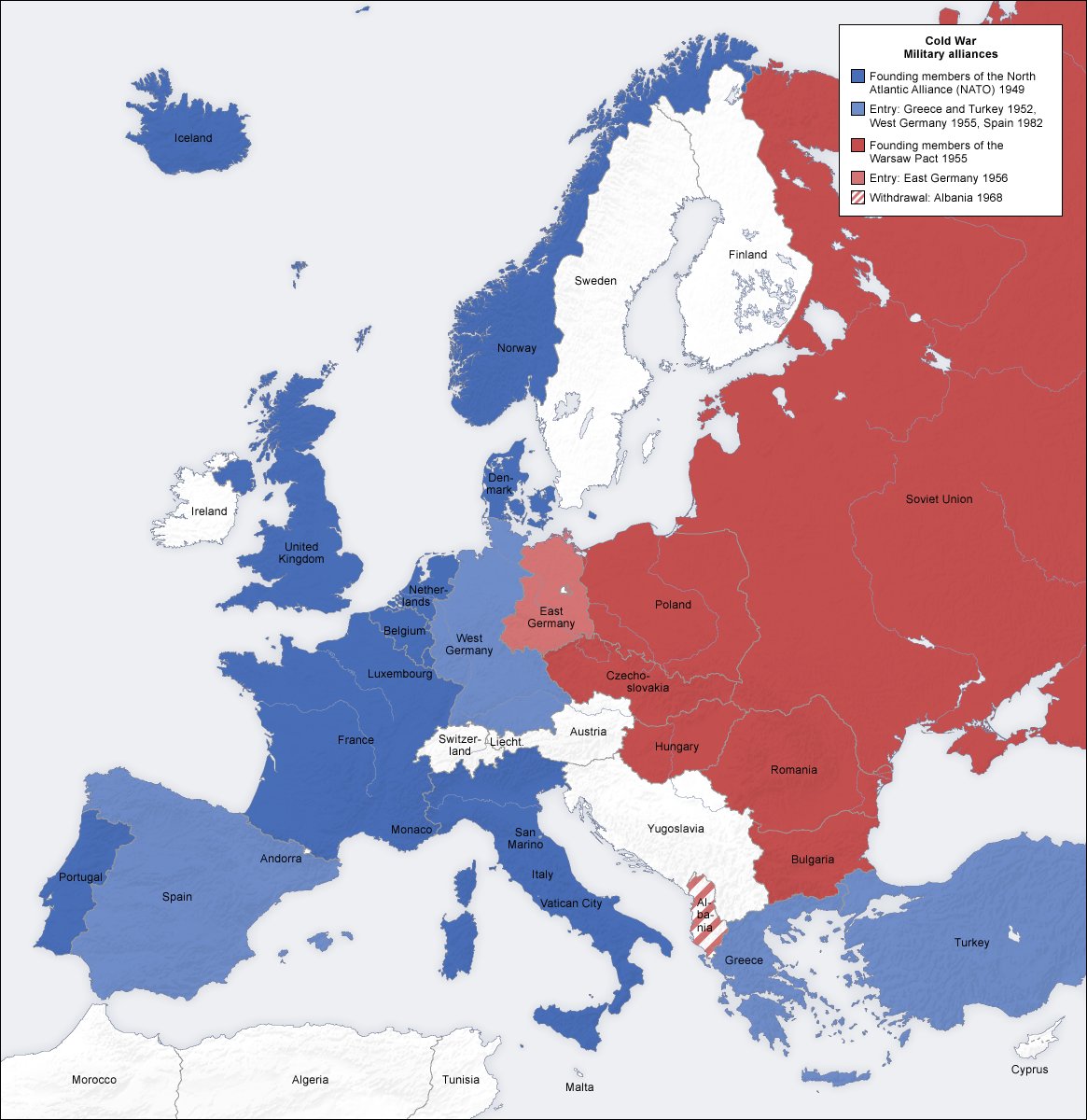
Map of NATO and the Warsaw Pact (which was created in 1955). The original NATO members are shaded dark blue.

Rising tensions with the Soviets, along with the Soviet veto of numerous United Nations Security Council resolutions, convinced Truman, Senator Vandenberg, and other American leaders of the necessity of creating a defensive alliance devoted to collective security. In 1949, the United States, Canada, and several European countries signed the North Atlantic Treaty, creating a trans-Atlantic military alliance and committing the United States to its first permanent alliance since the 1778 Treaty of Alliance with France. The treaty establishing NATO was widely popular and easily passed the Senate in 1949. NATO's goals were to contain Soviet expansion in Europe and to send a clear message to communist leaders that the world's democracies were willing and able to build new security structures in support of democratic ideals. The treaty also re-assured France that the United States would come to its defense, paving the way for continuing French cooperation in the re-establishment of an independent German state. The U.S., Britain, France, Italy, the Netherlands, Belgium, Luxembourg, Norway, Denmark, Portugal, Iceland, and Canada were the original treaty signatories. Shortly after the creation of NATO, Truman convinced Congress to pass the Mutual Defense Assistance Act, which created a military aid program for European allies.

Cold War tensions heightened following Soviet acquisition of nuclear weapons and the beginning of the Korean War. The U.S. increased its commitment to NATO, invited Greece and Turkey to join the alliance, and launched a second major foreign aid program with the passage of the Mutual Security Act. Truman permanently stationed 180,000 in Europe, and European defense spending grew from 5% to 12% of gross national product. NATO established a unified command structure, and Truman appointed General Dwight D. Eisenhower as the first Supreme Commander of NATO. West Germany, which fell under the aegis of NATO, would eventually be incorporated into NATO in 1955.

=== Spain ===
Truman usually worked well with his top advisors—the exceptions were Israel in 1948 and Francoist Spain in 1945–50. Truman was a very strong opponent of Francisco Franco, the right-wing dictator of Spain. He withdrew the American ambassador (but diplomatic relations were not formally broken), kept Spain out of the UN, and rejected any Marshall Plan financial aid to Spain. Liberal opposition to Spain faded after the Wallace element left the Democratic Party in 1948; the CIO dropped its attacks on Spain. When the Korean War began in 1950, support for Spain as an anti-Communist ally grew in Congress, the Pentagon, the business community and other influential elements such as Catholics and cotton growers. Secretary of State Acheson increased his pressure on Truman, and the president stood alone in his administration as his own top appointees wanted to normalize relations. Admitting that he was "overruled and worn down", Truman relented and sent an ambassador and made loans available. Military talks began and President Eisenhower established the Madrid Pact, a security agreement, in 1953.

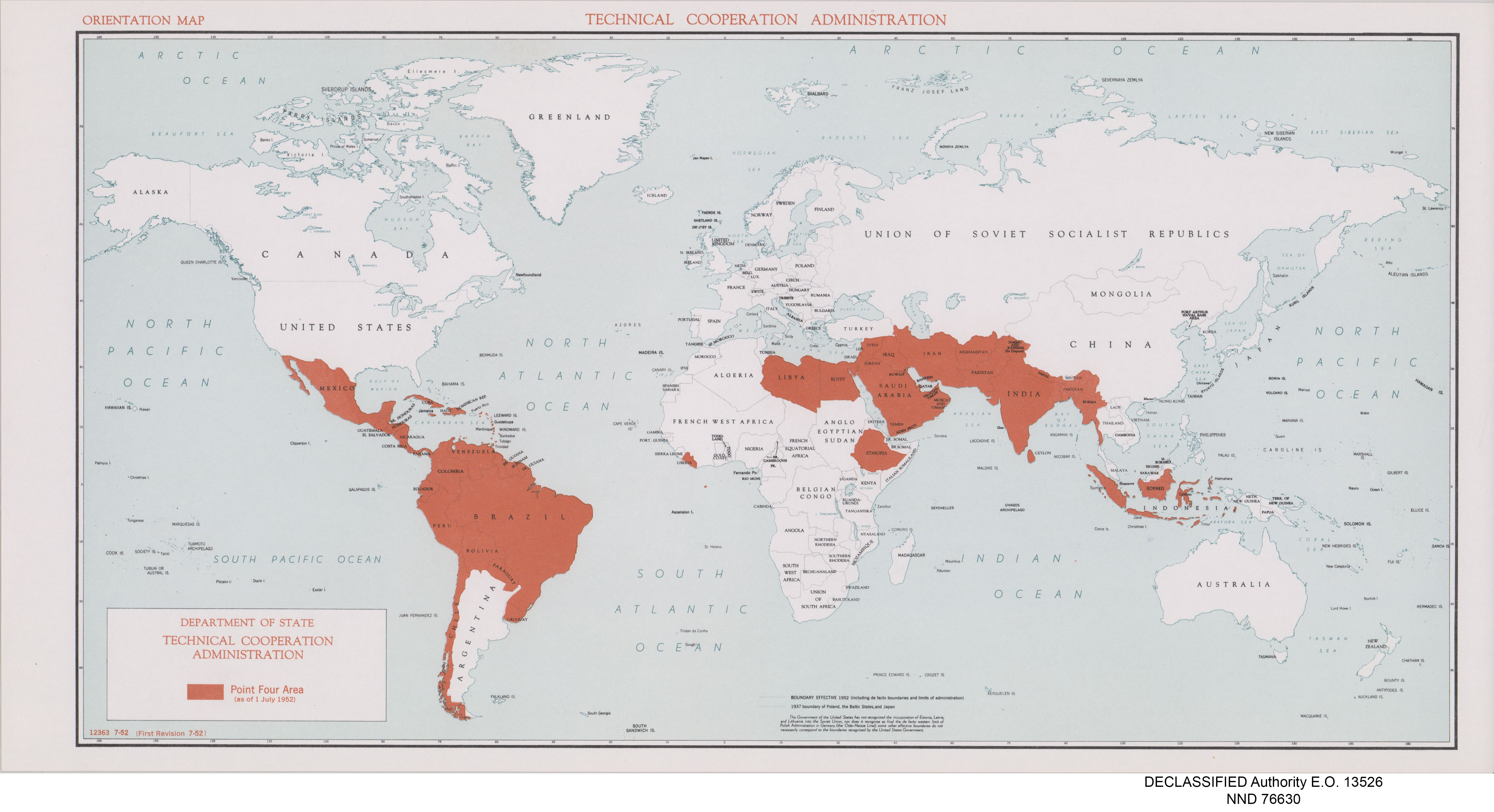
Countries in the Point Four Program in 1952

=== Point Four: technological aid to poor countries ===
Point Four was a new program of technological aid to poor developing countries that started in 1949. It began with a $25 million budget; Iran was an early favored recipient. In Nepal, Point Four promoted mineral development, agriculture and public health programs, and improved trade routes to India. Truman boasted it was the "Front line of the Cold War". The program encouraged private investment and many of its technical people went on to careers in international trade. The Eisenhower administration kept the policy but changed the name to the International Cooperation Administration and tied it to military objectives. It is now known as the United States Agency for International Development.

=== German rearmament ===
The rearmament of West Germany was achieved in the early 1950s. The main promoter was West German Chancellor Konrad Adenauer, with France the main opponent. Washington had the decisive voice. It was strongly supported by the Pentagon (the U.S. military leadership), and weakly opposed by President Harry S. Truman; the State Department was ambivalent. The outbreak of the Korean War in June 1950 changed the calculations and Washington now gave full support. That also involved putting Dwight D. Eisenhower in charge of NATO forces, and sending more American troops to West Germany.

Widespread fears of another rise of German militarism necessitated the new military to operate within an alliance framework, under NATO command. The events led to the establishment of the Bundeswehr, the West German military, in 1955.

==== NSC-68 in 1950 ====
In April 1950 the National Security Council approved NSC 68, drafted by Paul Nitze. It urgently called for rapid rearmament and a major expansion of the defense budget, increased aid to U.S. allies, and a more aggressive posture in the Cold War. Nitze used strong and alarming language to depict the Soviet Union as a country determined to expand and engage in aggressive behavior to maintain its Communist system. This statement gave a new global and militarized twist to the existing policy of containment, which was already being implemented in Europe and Japan. NSC-68 endorsed the use of any available means to protect the interests of democracies. Unlike the X article and the Long Telegram, NSC-68 portrayed a larger threat and asserted that a Soviet offensive against the West had become global.

The White House at first shelved NSC-68. However the sudden outbreak of the Korean War in June 1950 confirmed for Washington the warning issued in NSC-68 and its goals were adopted as the new policy. The Cold War had become hot in Asia. The crisis now convinced Washington of the urgent necessity for higher defense spending. The budget quadrupled between 1949 and 1953.

== Latin America ==
Cold War tensions and competition reached across the globe, affecting Europe, Asia, North America, Latin America, and Africa. The United States had historically focused its foreign policy on upholding the Monroe Doctrine in the Western Hemisphere, but new commitments in Europe and Asia diminished U.S. focus on Latin America. Partially in reaction to fears of expanding Soviet influence, the U.S. led efforts to create collective security pact in the Western Hemisphere. In 1947, the United States and most Latin American nations joined the Rio Pact, a defensive military alliance. The following year, the independent states of the Americas formed the Organization of American States (OAS), an intergovernmental organization designed to foster regional unity. Many Latin American nations, seeking favor with the United States, cut off relations with the Soviet Union. Latin American countries also requested aid and investment similar to the Marshall Plan, but did not get it. The Administration believed that most U.S. foreign aid was best directed to Europe and other areas that could potentially fall under the influence of Communism.

There was bad blood with Argentina. Washington detested dictator Juan Perón, who held fascist sympathies, tried to remain neutral in the Cold War and continued to harbor Nazi war criminals. Washington blocked funds from international agencies and restricted trade and investment opportunities. Meanwhile, Peron championed Anti-Americanism across Latin America, and financed radical elements in other countries. He did not, however, ally with the USSR in the Cold War.

== Asia ==
=== Recognition of Israel ===
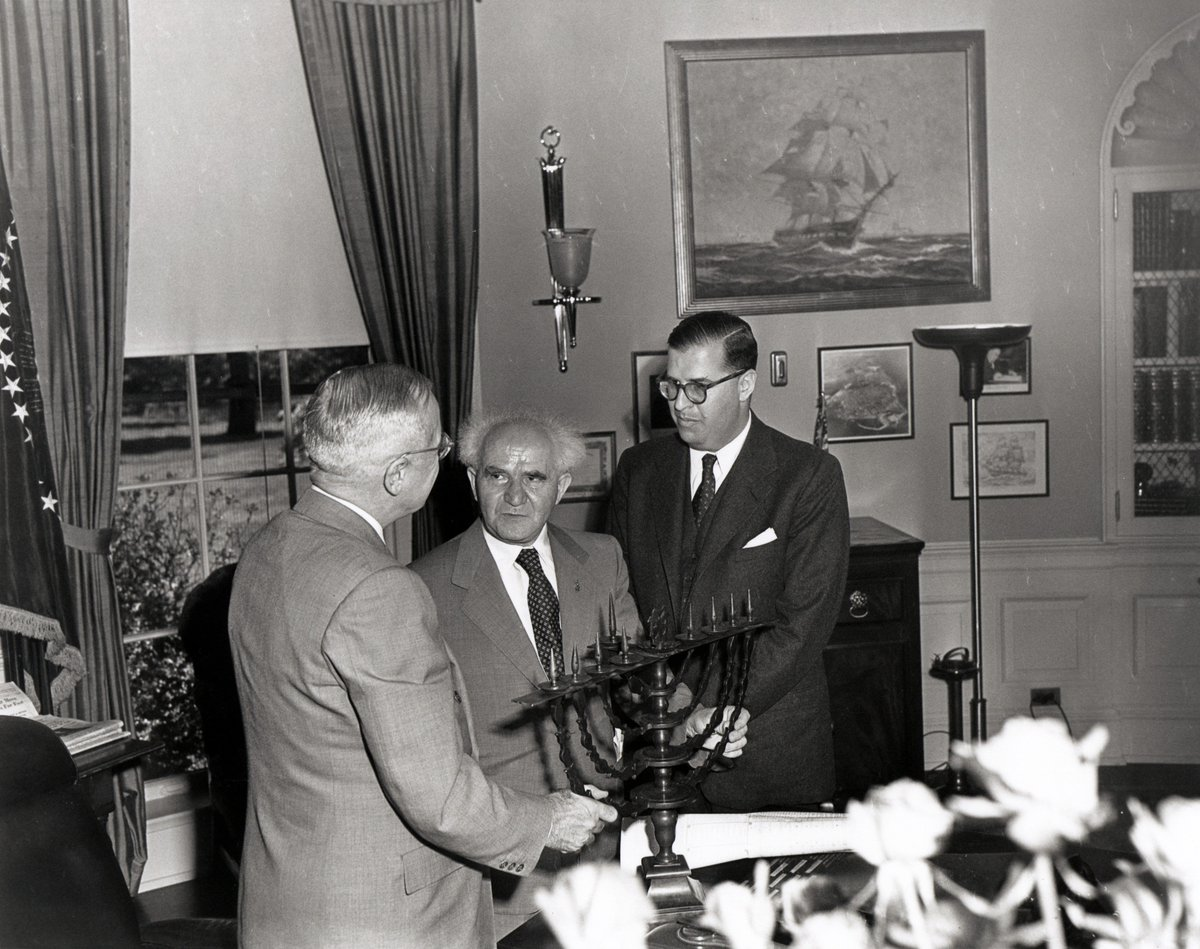
President Truman in the Oval Office, receiving a Hanukkah Menorah from the Prime Minister of Israel, David Ben-Gurion (center). To the right is Abba Eban, Ambassador of Israel to the U.S.

Truman had long been sympathetic to the Jewish community in Kansas City. Regarding British-controlled Mandatory Palestine, in 1943, he had called for a homeland for those Jews who survived the Nazi regime. However, State Department officials were reluctant to offend the Arabs, who were opposed to the establishment of a Jewish state in Palestine. Secretary of Defense Forrestal warned Truman of the importance of Saudi Arabia's supply of oil; Truman replied that he would decide his policy on the basis of justice, not oil. American diplomats with experience in the region were likewise opposed, but Truman told them he had few Arabs among his constituents. Regarding policy in the Eastern Mediterranean and the Middle East, Palestine was secondary to the goal of protecting the "Northern Tier" of Greece, Turkey, and Iran from communism.

In 1947, the United Nations approved the partition of Mandatory Palestine into a Jewish state and an Arab state. The British announced that they would withdraw from Palestine in May 1948, and Yishuv leaders began to organize a provisional government. Meanwhile, the Truman administration debated whether or not to recognize the fledgling state of Israel. Secretary of State Marshall argued that the consensus of that department was negative, because it would alienate the Arabs in the Middle East. Nevertheless Truman recognized the State of Israel on May 14, 1948, eleven minutes after it declared itself a nation. Israel quickly secured its independence with a victory in the 1948 Arab–Israeli War, but the Arab–Israeli conflict remains unresolved.

Truman would say that he did not think the decision to recognize Israel was "an easy one", adding "I had to make a compromise with the Arabs and divide Palestine. The Jews wanted to chase all the Arabs into the Tigris and Euphrates River and the Arabs wanted to chase all the Jews into the Red Sea. What I was trying to do is to find a homeland for the Jews and still be just with the Arabs."

=== China ===
In 1945 China descended into a civil war. The civil war baffled Washington, as both the Nationalist government under Chiang Kai-shek and the Chinese Communist Party under Mao Zedong had American advocates. Truman sent Marshall to China in early 1946 to broker a compromise featuring a coalition government. The mission failed, as both sides felt the issue would be decided on the battlefield, not at a conference table. Marshall returned to Washington in December 1946, blaming extremist elements on both sides. In mid-1947, Truman sent General Albert Coady Wedemeyer to China to try again, but no progress was made.

Though the Kuomintang held were strong in the large cities, Mao had a potentially much larger base in the rural villages. Steadily the Communists gained the upper hand after 1947. Corruption, poor economic conditions, and poor military leadership eroded popular support for the Nationalists. As the Nationalists collapsed in 1948, the Truman administration faced the question of whether to intervene on the side of the Nationalists or seek good relations with Mao. Chiang's strong support among sections of the American public, along with desire to assure other allies that the U.S. was committed to containment, convinced Truman to increase economic and military aid to the Nationalists. However, Truman held out little hope for a Nationalist victory, and he refused to send U.S. soldiers.

In 1949 the Communists took control of the mainland China, driving the Nationalists to Taiwan. The United States had a new enemy in Asia, and Truman came under fire from conservatives for "losing" China. Along with the Soviet detonation of a nuclear weapon, the Communist victory in the Chinese Civil War played a major role in escalating Cold War tensions and U.S. militarization during 1949. Truman would have been willing to maintain some relationship with the new government, but Mao was unwilling. Chiang established the Republic of China on Taiwan, which retained China's seat on the UN Security Council until 1971. (Note: For the historiography see Brazinsky, Gregg (2012). "The Birth of a Rivalry: Sino-American Relations during the Truman Administration". In Margolies, Daniel S. (ed.). A Companion to Harry S. Truman. pp. 484–497.) In June 1950, after the outbreak of fighting in Korea, Truman ordered the United States Seventh Fleet into the Taiwan Strait to prevent further conflict between the two Chinas.

=== Japan ===
Under the leadership of General Douglas MacArthur, the U.S. occupied Japan after its surrender in August 1945. MacArthur presided over extensive reforms of the Japanese government and society on the New Deal model. He imposed a new constitution that established a parliamentary democracy and granted women the right to vote. He also reformed the Japanese educational system and oversaw major economic changes, although Japanese business leaders were able to resist the reforms to some degree. As the Cold War intensified in 1947, the Truman administration took greater control over the occupation, ending Japanese reparations to the Allied Powers and prioritizing economic growth over long-term reform. The Japanese suffered from poor economic conditions until the beginning of the Korean War, when heavy American purchases stimulated growth. In 1951, the United States and Japan signed the Treaty of San Francisco, which restored Japanese sovereignty and allowed the United States to maintain bases in Japan. Over the opposition of the Soviet Union and some other adversaries of Japan in World War II, the peace treaty did not contain punitive measures such as reparations.

=== Southeast Asia ===
With the end of World War II, the United States fulfilled the commitment made by the 1934 Tydings–McDuffie Act and granted independence to the Philippines. The U.S. had encouraged decolonization throughout World War II, but the start of the Cold War changed priorities. The U.S. used the Marshall Plan to pressure the Dutch to grant independence to Indonesia under the leadership of the anti-Communist Sukarno, and the Dutch recognized Indonesia's independence in 1949. However, in French Indochina, the Truman administration recognized the French client state led by Emperor Bảo Đại. The U.S. feared alienating the French, who occupied a crucial position on the continent, and feared that the withdrawal of the French would allow the Communist faction of Ho Chi Minh to assume power. Despite initial reluctance to become involved in Indochina, by 1952, the United States was heavily subsidizing the French suppression of Ho's Việt Minh in the First Indochina War. The U.S. also established alliances in the region through the creation of the Mutual Defense Treaty with the Philippines and the ANZUS pact with Australia and New Zealand.

== Korean War ==
=== Outbreak of the war ===
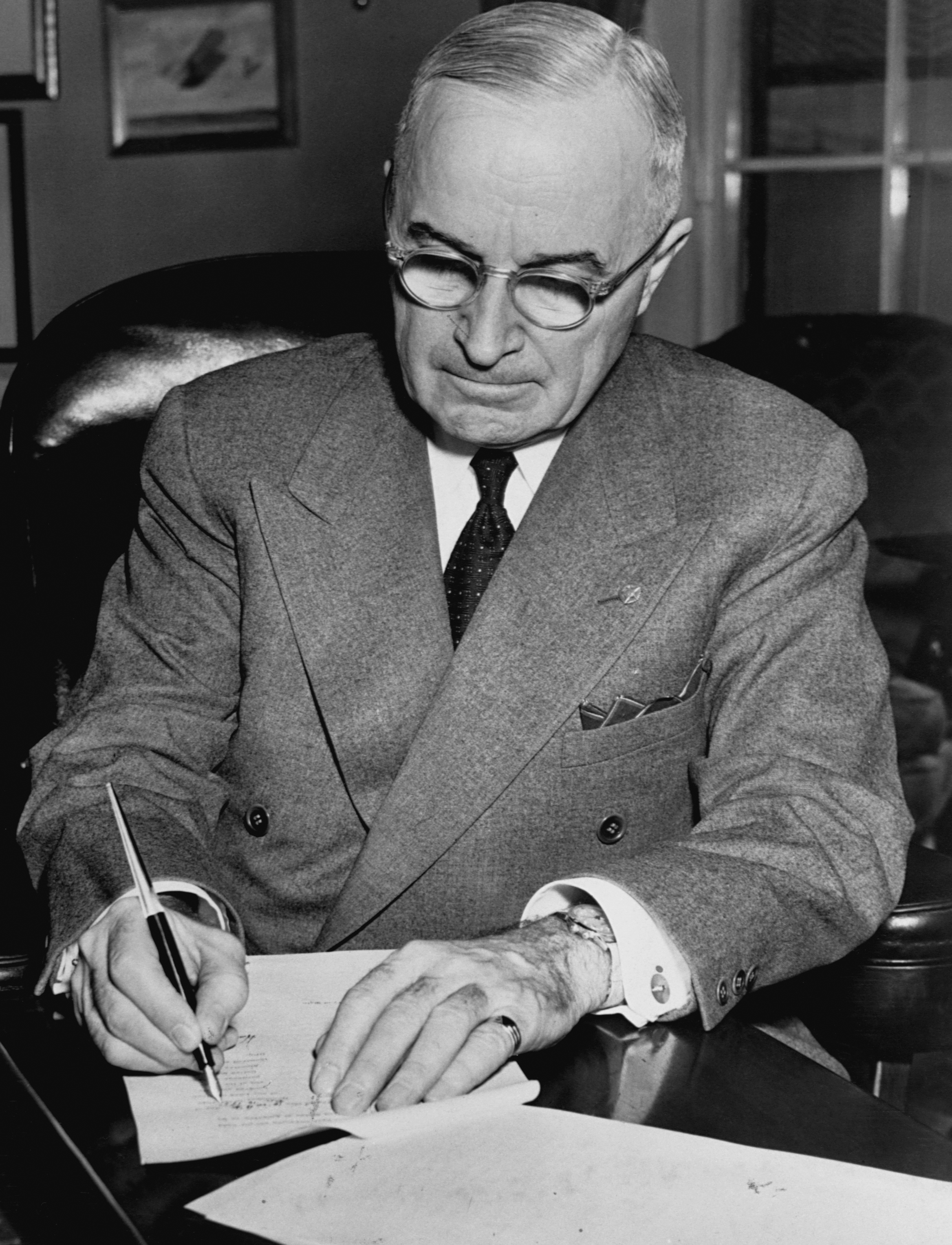
President Truman signing a proclamation declaring a national emergency and authorizing U.S. entry into the Korean War

Following World War II, the United States and the Soviet Union occupied Korea, which had been a colony of the Japanese Empire. The 38th parallel was chosen as a line of partition between the occupying powers since it was approximately halfway between Korea's northernmost and southernmost regions, and was always intended to mark a temporary separation before the eventual reunification of Korea. Nonetheless, the Soviet Union established the Democratic People's Republic of Korea (North Korea) in 1948, while the United States established the Republic of Korea (South Korea) that same year. Hoping to avoid a long-term military commitment in the region, Truman withdrew U.S. soldiers from the Korean Peninsula in 1949. The Soviet Union also withdrew their soldiers from Korea in 1949, but continued to supply North Korea with military aid.

After getting approval from Moscow and Beijing, on June 25, 1950, Kim Il Sung's Korean People's Army invaded South Korea, starting the Korean War. In the early weeks of the war, the North Koreans easily pushed back the southern forces. The Soviet Union was not officially involved, though it did provide pilots and warplanes. Truman believed that allowing a Western-aligned country to fall would embolden Communists around the world and damage his own standing at home. The top officials of the Truman administration were heavily influenced by a desire to not repeat the "appeasement" of Nazi Germany in the 1930s; Truman stated to an aide, "there's no telling what they'll do, if we don't put up a fight right now." Truman turned to the United Nations to condemn the invasion. With the Soviet Union boycotting the United Nations Security Council due to the UN's refusal to recognize the People's Republic of China, Truman won approval of Resolution 84. The resolution denounced North Korea's actions and empowered other nations to defend South Korea under the UN flag, with the U.S. in command. Rather than asking Congress for a declaration of war, Truman argued that the UN Resolution provided the presidency the constitutional power to deploy soldiers as a "police action" under the aegis of the UN. The intervention in Korea was widely popular in the United States at the time, and Truman's July 1950 request for $10 billion was approved almost unanimously.

North Korean forces experienced early successes, capturing the South Korean capital of Seoul on June 28. Fearing the fall of the entire peninsula, General Douglas MacArthur, commander of U.S. forces in Asia, landed American troops and sent in air and naval power. By August 1950, MacArthur had strikes, stabilized the front around the Pusan Perimeter. Responding to criticism over unreadiness, Truman fired Secretary of Defense Louis Johnson and replaced him with the elderly George Marshall. With UN approval, Truman decided on a "rollback" policy—conquest of North Korea. MacArthur's forces launched a counterattack, scoring a stunning surprise victory with an amphibious landing at the Battle of Inchon that trapped most of the invaders. The United Nations Command marched north, toward the Yalu River boundary with China, with the goal of reuniting Korea under UN auspices.

=== China pushes back; stalemate ===
Territory often changed hands early in the war, until the front stabilized. • North Korean, Chinese, and Soviet forces • South Korean, U.S., Commonwealth, and United Nations forces

As the UN forces approached the Yalu River, the CIA and General MacArthur both expected that the Chinese would remain out of the war. Defying those predictions, Chinese People's Volunteer Army forces crossed the Yalu River in November 1950 and forced the overstretched UN soldiers to retreat. Fearing that the escalation of the war could spark a global conflict with the Soviet Union, Truman refused MacArthur's request to bomb Chinese supply bases north of the Yalu River. UN forces were pushed below the 38th parallel before the end of 1950, but, under the command of General Matthew Ridgway, the UN launched a counterattack that pushed Chinese forces back up to the 38th parallel. the war then became a stalemate with North and South in approximately the same positions they held when the war began.

=== Dismissal of MacArthur ===
MacArthur made several public demands for an escalation of the war, leading to a break with Truman in late 1950 and early 1951. On April 5, House Republican Conference leader Joseph Martin made public a letter from MacArthur that strongly criticized Truman's handling of the Korean War and called for an expansion of the conflict against China. Washington believed that MacArthur's recommendations were wrong, but more importantly, Truman was angry that MacArthur had overstepped his bounds in trying to make foreign and military policy, potentially subverting the civilian control of the military. After consulting with the Joint Chiefs of Staff and members of Congress, Truman decided to relieve MacArthur of his command. The dismissal of General Douglas MacArthur ignited a firestorm of outrage against Truman and support for MacArthur. Fierce criticism from virtually all quarters accused Truman of refusing to shoulder the blame for a war gone sour and blaming his generals instead. Others, including Eleanor Roosevelt, supported and applauded Truman's decision. MacArthur meanwhile returned to the U.S. to a hero's welcome, and addressed a joint session of Congress. In part due to the dismissal of MacArthur, Truman's approval mark in February 1952 stood at 22% according to Gallup polls, which was, until George W. Bush in 2008, the all-time lowest approval mark for an active American president. Though the public generally favored MacArthur over Truman immediately after MacArthur's dismissal, congressional hearings and newspaper editorials helped turn public opinion against MacArthur's advocacy for escalation.

The war remained a frustrating stalemate for two years. UN and Chinese forces fought inconclusive conflicts like the Battle of Heartbreak Ridge and the Battle of Pork Chop Hill, but neither side was able to advance far past the 38th parallel. Throughout late 1951, Truman sought a cease fire, but disputes over prisoner exchanges led to the collapse of negotiations. Of the 116,000 Chinese and Korean prisoners-of-war held by the United States, only 83,000 were willing to return to their home countries, and Truman was unwilling to forcibly return the prisoners. The Korean War ended with an armistice in 1953 after Truman left office, dividing North Korea and South Korea along a border close to the 38th parallel. Over 30,000 Americans and approximately 3 million Koreans died in the conflict. The United States maintained a permanent military presence in South Korea after the war.

== International trips ==
Truman made five international trips during his presidency: His only trans-Atlantic trip was to participate in the 1945 Potsdam Conference with British Prime Ministers Churchill and Attlee and Soviet Premier Stalin. He also visited neighboring Bermuda, Canada and Mexico, plus Brazil in South America. Truman only left the continental United States on two other occasions (to Puerto Rico, the Virgin Islands, Guantanamo Bay Naval Base, Cuba, February 20 – March 5, 1948; and to Wake Island, October 11–18, 1950) during his nearly eight years in office.

	Dates	Country	Locations	Details
1	July 16 – August 2, 1945	Germany	Potsdam	Attended Potsdam Conference with British Prime Ministers Winston Churchill and Clement Attlee and Soviet dictator Joseph Stalin.
1	August 2, 1945	United Kingdom	Plymouth	Informal meeting with King George VI.
2	August 23–30, 1946	Bermuda	Hamilton	Informal visit. Met with Governor General Ralph Leatham and inspected U.S. military facilities.
3	March 3–6, 1947	Mexico	Mexico, D.F.	State visit. Met with President Miguel Alemán Valdés.
4	June 10–12, 1947	Canada	Ottawa	Official visit. Met with Governor General Harold Alexander and Prime Minister Mackenzie King and addressed Parliament.
5	September 1–7, 1947	Brazil	Rio de Janeiro	State visit. Addressed Inter-American Conference for the Maintenance of Continental Peace and Security and the Brazilian Congress.

== Legacy ==
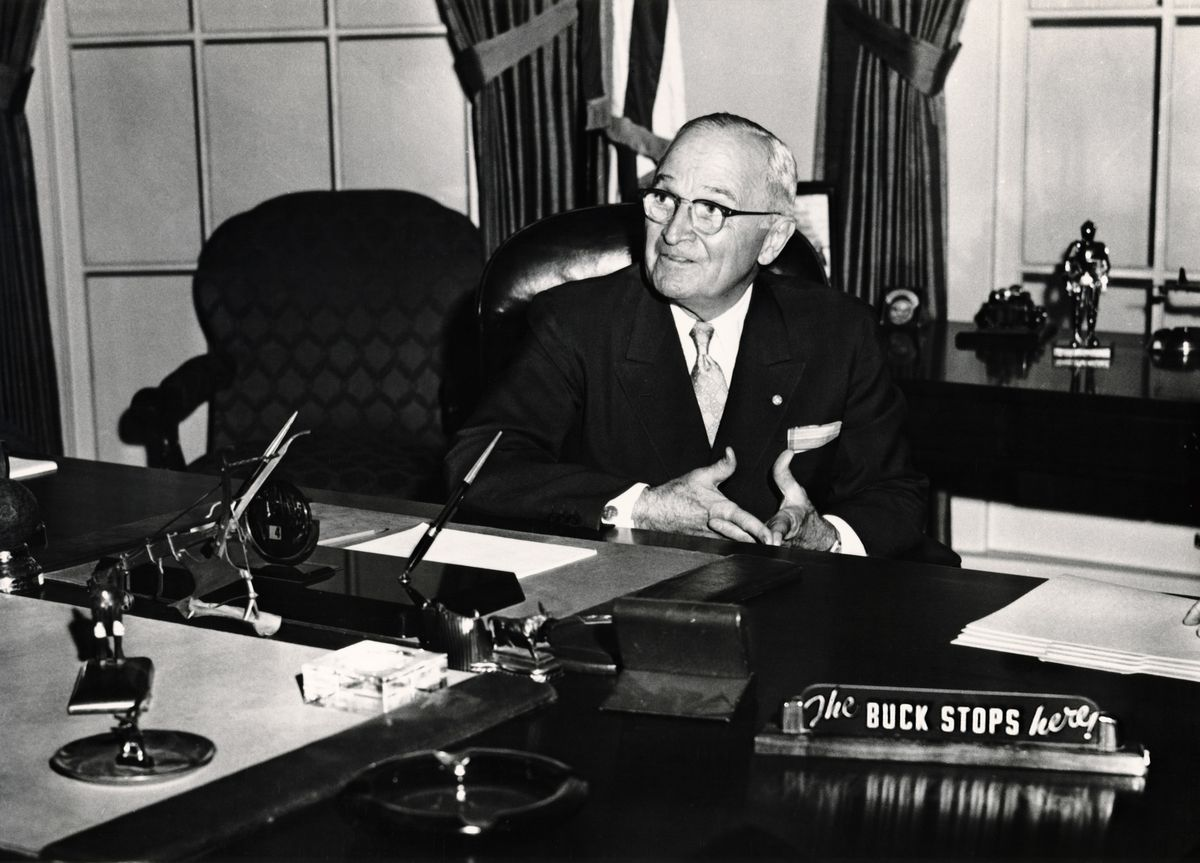
Truman poses in 1959 at the recreation of the Truman Oval Office at the Truman Library in 1959, with the famous "The Buck Stops Here" sign on his desk.

Scholars have on average ranked Truman in the top ten American presidents, most often at #7. In 1962, a poll of 75 historians conducted by Arthur M. Schlesinger, Sr. ranked Truman among the "near great" presidents. Truman's ranking in polls of political scientists and historians, never fallen lower than ninth, and ranking as high as fifth in a C-SPAN poll in 2009. A 2018 poll of the American Political Science Association's Presidents and Executive Politics section ranked Truman as the seventh best president. A 2017 C-SPAN poll of historians ranked Truman as the sixth best president.

According to Professor Alonzo Hamby, when left office in January 1953: "he was one of the most unpopular politicians in the United States. The Korean War, accusations of corruption in his administration, and the anticommunist red-baiting of McCarthy and his allies had all contributed to the President's poor standing with the public." Journalist Samuel Lubell wrote in 1952 that "after seven years of Truman's hectic, even furious, activity the nation seemed to be about on the same general spot as when he first came to office ... Nowhere in the whole Truman record can one point to a single, decisive break-through ... All his skills and energies—and he was among our hardest-working Presidents—were directed to standing still". Nonetheless, Truman's image in university textbooks was quite favorable in the 1950s.

During the years of campus unrest in the 1960s and 1970s revisionist historians on the left attacked his foreign policy as too hostile to Communism, and his domestic policy as too favorable toward business. That revisionism was not accepted by more established scholars. The harsh perspective faded with the decline in Communism's appeal after 1980, leading to a more balanced view.

The fall of the Soviet Union in 1991 caused Truman advocates to claim vindication for Truman's decisions in the postwar period. According to biographer Robert Dallek, "His contribution to victory in the cold war without a devastating nuclear conflict elevated him to the stature of a great or near-great president." The 1992 publication of David McCullough's favorable biography of Truman further cemented the view of Truman as a highly regarded Chief Executive. According to historian Daniel R. McCoy in his book on the Truman presidency:

Harry Truman himself gave a strong and far-from-incorrect impression of being a tough, concerned and direct leader. He was occasionally vulgar, often partisan, and usually nationalistic ... On his own terms, Truman can be seen as having prevented the coming of a third world war and having preserved from Communist oppression much of what he called the free world. Yet clearly he largely failed to achieve his Wilsonian aim of securing perpetual peace, making the world safe for democracy, and advancing opportunities for individual development internationally.

== See also ==
- Presidency of Harry S. Truman
- History of United States foreign policy#Cold War: 1947–1991
