= Álvaro Alberto (disambiguation) =

Álvaro Alberto may refer to:

- Álvaro Alberto da Motta e Silva, a Brazilian vice admiral and scientist
- Central Nuclear Almirante Álvaro Alberto, a nuclear power plant in Brazil
- Brazilian submarine Álvaro Alberto, a Brazilian nuclear submarine
