= Melvyn P. Leffler =

American historian and educator (born 1945)

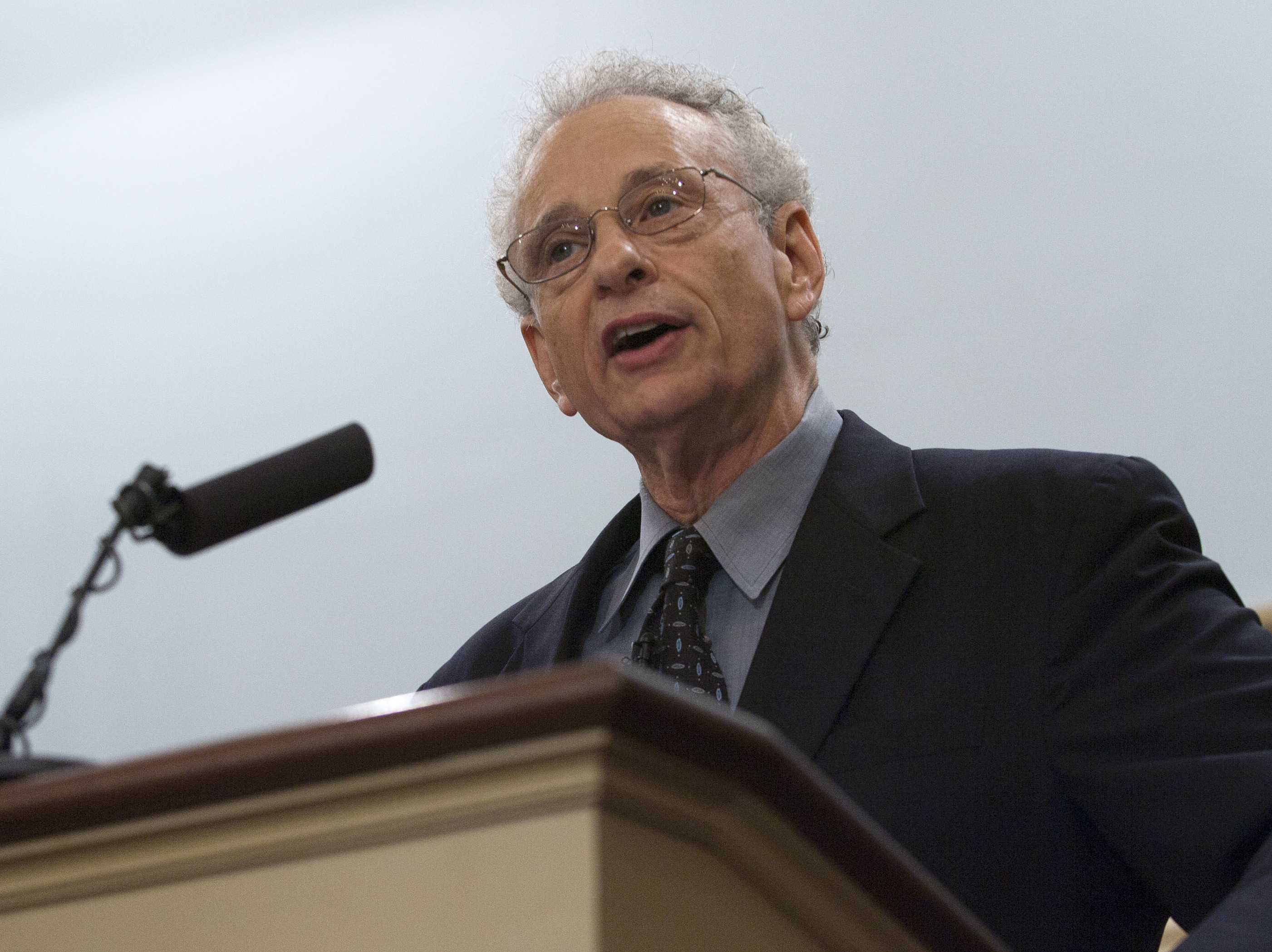
- Leffler in 2011
- Born: May 31, 1945 (age 81); New York City, New York, United States
- Education: Cornell University (BS); Ohio State University (PhD)
- Occupations: Historian; educator
- Spouse: Phyllis Koran (m. 1968)
- Children: 1 daughter and son
- Parent(s): Louis Leffler; Mollie Leffler
- Writing career
- Notable awards: Bancroft Prize (1993); George Louis Beer Prize (2008)

Melvyn Paul Leffler (born May 31, 1945) is an American historian and educator, currently Edward Stettinius Professor of History at the University of Virginia. He is the winner of numerous awards, including the Bancroft Prize for his book A Preponderance of Power: National Security, the Truman Administration and the Cold War, and the American Historical Association’s George Louis Beer Prize for his book For the Soul of Mankind: The United States, the Soviet Union, and the Cold War.

== Life ==
The son of businessman Louis and Mollie Leffler, he married historian Phyllis Koran on September 1, 1968; they have one daughter, Sarah Ann and one son, Elliot.

== Education ==
Leffler received a BS from Cornell University in 1966, and a PhD from Ohio State University in 1972.

== Career ==
Leffler taught at Vanderbilt University as assistant professor in 1972 to 1977, and associate professor of history in 1977 to 2002. He was chairman of the department of history and dean of the college and Graduate School of Arts & Sciences at the University of Virginia from 1997 to 2001. In 1994, he was president of the Society for Historians of American Foreign Relations. He was Harold Vyvyan Harmsworth Professor of American History at the University of Oxford from 2002 to 2003. He currently teaches at the University of Virginia as a professor of history and is a scholar of the Miller Center.

Books he has authored or edited include the following: Safeguarding Democratic Capitalism: U.S. Foreign Policy and National Security, 1920-2015 (Princeton University Press, 2017); The Cambridge History of the Cold War (3 vols.; Cambridge University Press, 2010); and The Cold War: An International History (2nd ed.; Routledge, 2005).

In 2014, the University of Virginia gave him its Thomas Jefferson Award for excellence in scholarship. The Society of Historians of American Foreign Relations honored him in 2012 with its Laura and Norman Graebner Award for lifetime achievement and service.

Leffler has served on advisory committees to the State Department and the Central Intelligence Agency, particularly concerning the declassification of documents.

== Awards ==
- 2008 George Louis Beer Prize for For the Soul of Mankind: the United States, the Soviet Union, and the Cold War
- 2004-2005 Randolph Jennings Fellow, United States Institute of Peace
- 2004-2005 Henry Kissinger Fellow, Library of Congress
- 2001-2002 Woodrow Wilson International Center for Scholars Fellow
- 1993 Bancroft Prize for A Preponderance of Power: National Security, the Truman Administration and the Cold War
- 1993 Ferrell Prize
- 1993 Hoover Prizes
- 1993, 1997 Norwegian Nobel Peace Institute Fellowship
- 1973, 1984-85 American Council of Learned Societies, Fellowships, Grants-in-Aid
- 1984-85 Lehrman Institute Fellowship

== Selected publications ==
- Confronting Saddam Hussein: George W. Bush and the Invasion of Iraq, Oxford University Press, 2023.
- For the Soul of Mankind: The United States, the Soviet Union, and the Cold War. New York, NY: Hill & Wang. 2007. ISBN 978-0-809-09717-3.
- "The Beginning and the End: Time, Context, and the Cold War". In Olav Njølstad, ed., The Last Decade of the Cold War: From Conflict Escalation to Conflict Transformation. London & New York, NY: Frank Cass. 2004. pp. 23–49. ISBN 978-0-7146-8539-7.
- "Bringing It Together: Parts and the Whole". In Odd Arne Westad, ed., Reviewing the Cold War: Approaches, Interpretations, Theory. London & Portland, OR: Frank Cass. 2000. pp. 43–63. ISBN 978-0-714-65072-2.
- Paul Kennedy; William I. Hitchcock, eds. (2000). "American Grand Strategy from World War to Cold War 1940-1950". From war to peace: altered strategic landscapes in the twentieth century. Yale University Press. ISBN 978-0-300-08010-0.
- "Inside Enemy Archives: The Cold War Reopened", Foreign Affairs, July/August 1996
- Eric Foner, ed. (1994). The Specter of Communism: The United States and the Origins of the Cold War, 1917-1953. Hill and Wang. ISBN 978-0-8090-1574-0.
- Gordon Martel, ed. (1994). "The interpretative wars over the Cold War 1945-1960". American foreign relations reconsidered, 1890-1993. Routledge. ISBN 978-0-415-10476-0.
- Michael J. Hogan; Thomas G. Paterson, eds. (2004). "National Security". Explaining the history of American foreign relations. Cambridge University Press. ISBN 978-0-521-54035-3. (2nd edition)
- A Preponderance of Power: National Security, The Truman Administration, and the Cold War. Stanford University Press. 1992. ISBN 978-0-8047-2218-6.
- Loyd E. Lee, ed. (1991). "Adherence to Agreements: Yalta and the Experiences of the Early Cold War". World War II: crucible of the contemporary world: commentary and readings. M.E. Sharpe. ISBN 978-0-87332-732-9.
- Ellis Wayne Hawley, ed. (1981). "Herbert Hoover, the "New Era," and American Foreign Policy 1921-1929". Herbert Hoover as Secretary of Commerce: studies in New Era thought and practice. University of Iowa Press. ISBN 978-0-87745-109-9.
- The Elusive Quest: America's Pursuit of European Stability and French Security, 1919-1933. University of North Carolina Press. 1979. ISBN 978-0-8078-1333-1.

=== Editor ===
- (Co-editor with Odd Arne Westad). The Cambridge History of the Cold War 3 Volume Set. Cambridge: Cambridge University Press. 2010. ISBN 978-0-521-83938-9.
- (Co-editor with Jeffrey W. Legro). To Lead the World: After the Bush Doctrine. Oxford University Press. 2008. ISBN 978-0-19-536941-0.
- (Co-editor with David S. Painter). Origins of the Cold War: An International History (2nd ed.). New York & London: Routledge. 2005 [1994]. ISBN 978-0-415-34109-7.

== See also ==
- Baruch Plan
