= Jeffrey W. Legro =

American political scientist and professor

Jeffrey Wenner Legro
- Born: 1959 or 1960 (age 66–67)
- Education: Middlebury College (BA, 1982); University of California, Los Angeles (MA, 1988; PhD, 1992)
- Occupations: Professor, university administrator
- Notable work: Cooperation Under Fire; Rethinking the World; To Lead the World; In Uncertain Times; Shaper Nations
- Children: 2 daughters
- Awards: Fulbright Fellowship (2002, 2011)

Executive Vice President and Provost of the University of Richmond
- In office 2017–2023

Vice Provost for Global Affairs of the University of Virginia
- In office 2012–2017

Academic background
- Thesis: Cooperation Within Conflict: Submarines, Strategic Bombing, Chemical Warfare and Restraint in World War II (1992)

Academic work
- Discipline: Political science
- Institutions: University of Richmond; University of Virginia; Harvard University; University of Minnesota

Jeffrey W. Legro (born 1959 or 1960) is an American political scientist and professor at the University of Richmond, where he was also the executive vice president and provost from 2017 to 2023. Before that, he was a professor and vice provost for global affairs at the University of Virginia.

A specialist in U.S. foreign policy and international affairs, Legro has written and co-edited numerous books and articles, including Rethinking the World: Great Power Strategies and International Order. He has researched and taught in China, India, Germany, Russia, and the United Kingdom. He is also a member of the Council on Foreign Relations and a board member of the Richmond World Affairs Council.

== Early life and education ==
Legro is the son of Janet and Robert Legro. He earned his bachelor's degree at Middlebury College in 1982, majoring in economics and Russian, magna cum laude, and was elected to the academic honor society Phi Beta Kappa. He went on to earn a master's degree (1988) and doctorate (1992) at the University of California, Los Angeles, both in political science. From 1987 to 1989 he was a pre-doctoral fellow at Harvard University’s Center for Science and International Affairs. His doctoral dissertation, Cooperation Within Conflict: Submarines, Strategic Bombing, Chemical Warfare and Restraint in World War II, was revised and later published as his 1995 book, Cooperation Under Fire.

== Career ==
Legro began his academic career as an assistant professor in political science at the University of Minnesota from 1992 to 1997 and was a fellow and seminar chair at Harvard University's Olin Institute for Strategic Studies from 1995 to 1997.

=== University of Virginia ===
Legro joined the University of Virginia as an associate professor in 1997, and became a full professor in 2006. He was the chair of the department of politics in 2007–2010, and the acting chair in 2000–2001. At UVA's Miller Center of Public Affairs, he was the Randolph P. Compton Professor of World Politics from 2007 to 2012, as well as the co-founder of the Governing America in a Global Era Program. From 2012 to 2017, Legro was the department of politics' Ambassador Henry J. Taylor and Mrs. Marion R. Taylor Professor.

In 2012, Legro was appointed to UVA's administration as vice provost for global affairs, where he served until 2017. His work included developing global partnerships and curriculum to strengthen teaching and research at the university. He helped spearhead the university's Global Grounds initiative, which included the creation of a global studies major, founding the Center for Global Inquiry and Innovation, a global internship program, and increasing university connections with India and China. Also in 2015, UVA received the Senator Paul Simon Award for Campus Internationalization from the Association of International Educators.

=== University of Richmond ===
In 2017, Legro joined the University of Richmond as provost and executive vice president for academic affairs and professor of political science.

As executive vice president and provost, Legro oversaw Richmond's academic mission, Richmond's five schools, enrollment management, student development, and planning and policy. He led initiatives such as the Faculty Teaching and Scholarship Hub, the Faculty Fellows program, the Program on Academic Leadership, the program on Creativity, Innovation, and Entrepreneurship and developing a comprehensive student learning center. He helped the university develop new Africana studies, data analytics, and health studies programs and a new general education curriculum.

His tenure at Richmond included helping lead the university through the challenges of the COVID-19 pandemic, with successful in-person instruction from the fall of 2020 onward.

In 2023, Legro stepped down from his administrative role as provost to focus on teaching and research as University Professor at Richmond.

=== Other work ===
Before becoming a professor, Legro was an analyst for the Capital Group (1983–1985) and a consultant at the RAND Corporation (1985–1992).

Legro served as president of the American Political Science Association's (APSA) International History and Politics section from 2008 to 2010. In 2009, Legro (along with fellow political scientist Peter Katzenstein) led APSA's Task Force on U.S. Standing in World Affairs. The 20-member group examined the drop in American standing both internationally and among the U.S. population from 2002 to 2008.

Legro is a two-time recipient of a Fulbright Program grant, awarded to American scholars studying international relations, and worked as a Fulbright-Nehru Senior Researcher at the Institute for Defense and Strategic Analysis in New Delhi, India in 2011 and a Fulbright Lecturer at China Foreign Affairs University in Beijing in 2002–2003.

Legro was a visiting professor at the London School of Economics and Political Science's Phelan US Centre in 2023–24.

He has also been awarded fellowships or grants from the Council on Foreign Relations, U.S. Institute of Peace, Ford Foundation, the Institute on Global Conflict and Cooperation, and the Institute for the Study of World Politics.

== Books ==
Legro's first book, 1995's Cooperation Under Fire: Anglo-German Restraint in World War II, examined why the combatants during World War II did or did not escalate in the use of previously "unthinkable" methods such as submarine warfare, civilian bombing, and chemical weapons, all of which were constrained by international agreements signed before the war.

His 2005 book Rethinking the World: Great Power Strategies and International Order analyzed several instances in history when nations fundamentally changed their foreign policy and their approach to international order, such as Tokugawa's opening to foreign trade, the breakup of the Soviet Union, and the massive realignments before and after World Wars I and II.

With Melvyn Leffler, Legro co-edited the 2008 book To Lead the World: American Strategy After the Bush Doctrine, a collection of essays on geopolitics from writers such as James Kurth, Francis Fukuyama, David Kennedy, and Niall Ferguson.

Legro and Leffler also co-edited 2011's In Uncertain Times: American Foreign Policy After the Berlin Wall and 9/11, a collection of essays by scholars and policymakers including Bruce Cumings, Eric S. Edelman, John Mueller, Mary Elise Sarotte, Walter B. Slocombe, Odd Arne Westad, William C. Wohlforth, Paul Wolfowitz, Philip Zelikow, and Robert Zoellick. The book examined how dramatic events such as the 9/11 terrorist attacks and the fall of the Berlin Wall changed international economic and defense strategies.

With William Hitchcock and Melvyn Leffler, Legro co-edited the 2016 book Shaper Nations: Strategies for a Changing World. The collection of essays looks ahead to an era of international multipolarity and the countries most likely to be significant powers in the future: Brazil, China, Germany, India, Israel, Russia, Turkey, and the United States.

=== Other writing ===
Legro's writing on American foreign policy and international politics, military doctrine and strategy has been published in journals such as Foreign Policy, American Political Science Review, International Organization, International Security, American Journal of Political Science, European Journal of International Relations, Perspectives on Politics, and Cambridge Review of International Affairs.

He has also contributed to books such as The Culture of National Security (1996); China's Ascent: Power, Security, and the Future of International Politics (2008); Avoiding Trivia: The Role of Strategic Planning in American Foreign Policy (2009), and International Relations Theory and the Consequences of Unipolarity (2011).

== Personal life ==
He has been married to The Rev. Janet Hatfield Legro, a graduate of St. Lawrence University and Harvard University, since 1991. They have two daughters.

== Selected publications ==
=== Books ===
- Jeffrey W. Legro, Cooperation Under Fire: Anglo-German Restraint During World War II (Cornell University Press, 1995)
- Jeffrey W. Legro, Rethinking the World: Great Power Strategies and International Order (Cornell University Press, 2005)
- Jeffrey W. Legro and Melvyn Leffler, eds., To Lead the World: U.S. Strategy after the Bush Doctrine (Oxford University Press, 2008)
- Jeffrey W. Legro and Melvyn Leffler, eds., In Uncertain Times: American Foreign Policy After the Berlin Wall and 9/11 (Cornell University Press, 2011)
- William Hitchcock, Jeffrey W. Legro, and Melvyn Leffler, eds., Shaper Nations: Strategies for a Changing World (Harvard University Press, 2016)

=== Chapters in books ===
- Kurt Campbell and Jeffrey W. Legro, "Soviet National Security Decision Making," in A Primer for the Nuclear Age (University Press of America, 1990)
- Paul Kowert and Jeffrey Legro, "Norms, Identity, and Their Limits: A Theoretical Reprise," in The Culture of National Security: Norms and Identity in World Politics (Columbia University Press, 1996)
- Jeffrey W. Legro, "The Culture and Command Conundrum," in Strategic Policy Studies 3: Culture and Command (SPSG, 2000)
- Jeffrey W. Legro, "Purpose Transitions: China and the American Response,” in China’s Ascent: Power, Security, and the Future of International Politics (Cornell University Press, 2008)
- Jeffrey W. Legro and Melvyn Leffler, "Introduction" and "Dilemmas of Strategy" in To Lead the World: U.S. Strategy after the Bush Doctrine (Oxford University Press, 2008)
- Jeffrey W. Legro, “A Return to Normalcy? Managing American Internationalism,” in Avoiding Trivia: The Role of Strategic Planning in American Foreign Policy (Brookings Institution, 2009)
- Jeffrey W. Legro and Melvyn Leffler, "Introduction" and "Managing the Murky Future" in In Uncertain Times: American Foreign Policy after the Berlin Wall and 9/11 (Cornell University Press, 2011)
- Jeffrey W. Legro, “Sell Unipolarity? The Future of an Overvalued Concept," in International Relations Theory and the Consequences of Unipolarity (Cambridge University Press, 2011)
- Jeffrey W. Legro, "The Omnipower: The United States and Regional Orders," in Regional Powers and Regional Orders (Routledge, 2011)
- Jeffrey W. Legro, "Sovereignty American Style: Protecting Apple Pie, Fixing Foreign Recipes," in America, China, and the Struggle for World Order (Palgrave Macmillan, 2015)
- Jeffrey W. Legro, "The World They Will Make," in Shaper Nations: Strategies for a Changing World (Harvard University Press, 2016).

=== Journal articles ===
- Jeffrey W. Legro, "The Military Meaning of the New Soviet Doctrine." Parameters (1989) Reprinted in Fundamentals of Force Planning: Volume I: Concepts (Naval War College Press, 1990)
- Robert D. Blackwill and Jeffrey W. Legro, "Constraining Ground Force Exercises of NATO and the Warsaw Pact." International Security (1989–1990)
- Jeffrey Legro, "Soviet Crisis Decision-Making and the Gorbachev Reforms". Survival (1989) Reprinted in RAND Corporation Occasional Papers Series, OPS-014 (RAND/UCLA Center for Soviet Studies, 1989)
- Jeffrey Legro, " Trip Report: Admiral Crowe's Visit to the Soviet Union, March 17–25, 1990." RAND Corporation Occasional Papers (Soviet) 016 (1990)
- Jeffrey W. Legro, "Military Culture and Inadvertent Escalation in World War II." International Security (1994)
- Jeffrey W. Legro, "Culture and Preferences in the International Cooperation Two-Step." American Political Science Review (1996) Reprinted in Security Studies: Critical Concepts in International Relations (Routledge, 2009)
- Jeffrey W. Legro, "Which Norms Matter? Revisiting the "Failure" of Internationalism." International Organization (1997) Reprinted in International Law and International Relations (Cambridge University Press, 2007)
- Jeffrey W. Legro and Andrew Moravcsik, "Is Anybody Still a Realist?" International Security (1999) Reprinted in The Realism Reader (Routledge 2014).
- Jeffrey W. Legro, "The Transformation of Policy Ideas." American Journal of Political Science (2000)
- Jeffrey W. Legro, "Whence American Internationalism." International Organization (2000) Reprinted in American Foreign Policy: 6 Theoretical Essays (Oxford University Press, 2014)
- Jeffrey W. Legro and Andrew Moravcsik, "Faux Realism: Spin vs. Substance in the Bush Foreign Policy Doctrine.” Foreign Policy (2001)
- Jeffrey W. Legro, "What China Will Want: The Future Intentions of a Rising Power." Perspectives on Politics (2007) Reprinted in International Relations in Perspective: A Reader (CQ Press, 2010)
- J.W. Legro, "The Plasticity of Identity under Anarchy". European Journal of International Relations (2009)
- Jeffrey W. Legro, "The Mix That Makes Unipolarity: Hegemonic Purpose and International Constraints.” Cambridge Review of International Affairs (2011)
- Jeffrey W. Legro, "The Politics of the New Global Architecture: The United States and India.” Strategic Analysis (2012)
