= United Nations Security Council Resolution 20 =

United Nations Security Council resolution

UN Security Council Resolution 20
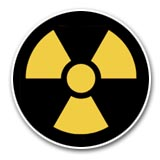
- Date: 10 March 1947
- Meeting no.: 117
- Code: S/296 (Document)
- Subject: Atomic energy: International control
- Voting summary: 11 voted for; None voted against; None abstained
- Result: Adopted

Security Council composition
- Permanent members: China; France; Soviet Union; United Kingdom; United States
- Non-permanent members: Australia; Belgium; Brazil; Colombia; Poland; Syria

United Nations Security Council Resolution 20 was adopted unanimously on 10 March 1947. The Council urged the Atomic Energy Commission to continue its investigation into the international control of atomic energy and to submit a second report to the General Assembly.
