= David S. Painter =

Associate professor of international history

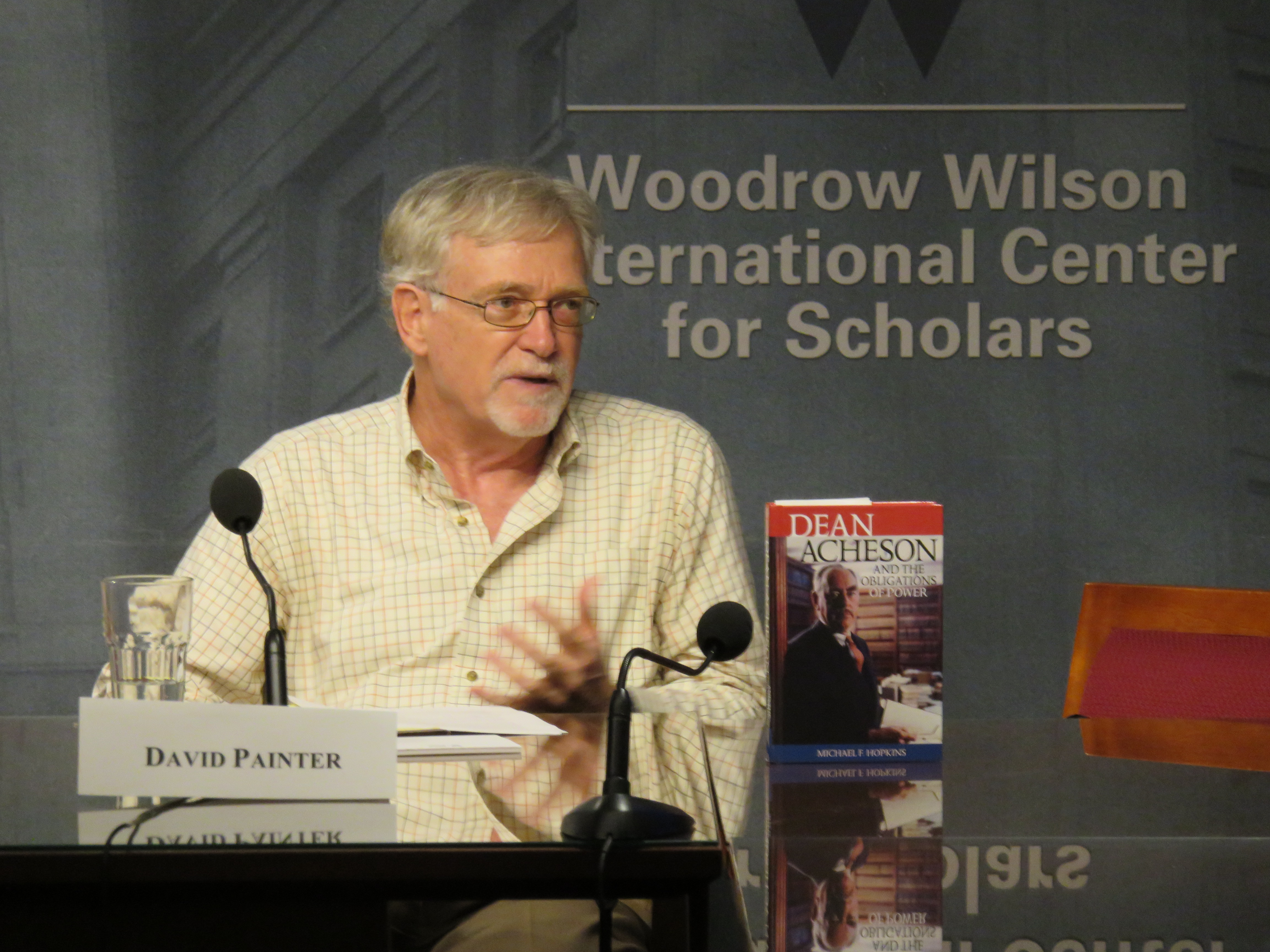
- Georgetown University Associate Professor of international history David S. Painter, as the respondent at the Book Launch, Michael F. Hopkins's Dean Acheson and the Obligations of Power, Woodrow Wilson International Center for Scholars, Washington, D.C., 19 June 2017
- Born: 1948 (age 77–78)
- Occupation: Professor

David S. Painter (born 1948) is an associate professor of international history at Georgetown University. He is a scholar of the Cold War and United States foreign policy during the 20th century, with particular emphasis on their relation to oil.

== Education and career ==
Painter studied history at King College (BA 1970), Oxford as a Rhodes Scholar (BA 1973), and the University of North Carolina at Chapel Hill (PhD 1982). In addition to his career in academia, Painter has worked for the Congressional Research Service, the Department of Energy, and the State Department. In 2008, he was a visiting fellow at the Norwegian Nobel Institute. He also serves on the advisory board for H-Energy.

== Work ==
Painter's classic work has turned out to be his first book: Oil and the American Century, published in 1986. Influenced by the work of Ellis Hawley and others, and operating within a corporatist framework, the study is an "impressively researched monograph that devotes particular attention to the close collaboration between public policy makers and oil company official," a partnership that led to "the evolution of an American foreign oil policy that protected dwindling American domestic reserves, met American security needs, and guaranteed American access to foreign oil." Painter emphasizes on the importance of understanding the extent to which the American economy is fueled by Oil and how United States has used oil to pursue their foreign policy and domestic strategic objectives. In his paper Painter argues, “Maintaining access to oil became a key priority of U.S foreign policy and involved the United States in regional and conflicts in Latin America, the Middle East and other oil-producing areas in ways that distorted development in many countries” and “The importance of oil to U.S goals led the nation to take an active interest in the security and stability of the Middle East. U.S leaders viewed Iran as a strategic buffer between the Soviet Union and U.S oil interests in the Persian Gulf” Providing more details, he examines the source of major doctrines and writes “Most of the major doctrines of postwar U.S foreign policy – the Truman, Eisenhower, Nixon and Carter Doctrines-related, either directly or indirectly, to the Middle East and its oil”. He also adds on how control over Persian oil remains a top U.S. priority, “Even though the United States obtained only a relatively small portions of its oil needs from the Persian Gulf, Oil from this region played a crucial role in the world oil economy, and the global nature of world oil markets meant that shortfall anywhere would reflected in higher prices, if not shortages, in other parts of the worlds”

One historian opined that, "if anything proves more remarkable than the ambitious scope of this study, it is the extent to which Painter accomplishes his objectives. [… It] may also be the most important book yet written on America's foreign oil policy." Others described it variously as "exemplary" and "superb". The 1987 UK edition has not been out of print since its original publication.

Painter's 1999 history of the Cold War was described as "excellent", a book that "presents a very good analysis of the end of the Cold War, emphasizing the economic weakness of the Soviet Union and the strains of the arms race upon the Soviet economy."

== Selected publications ==
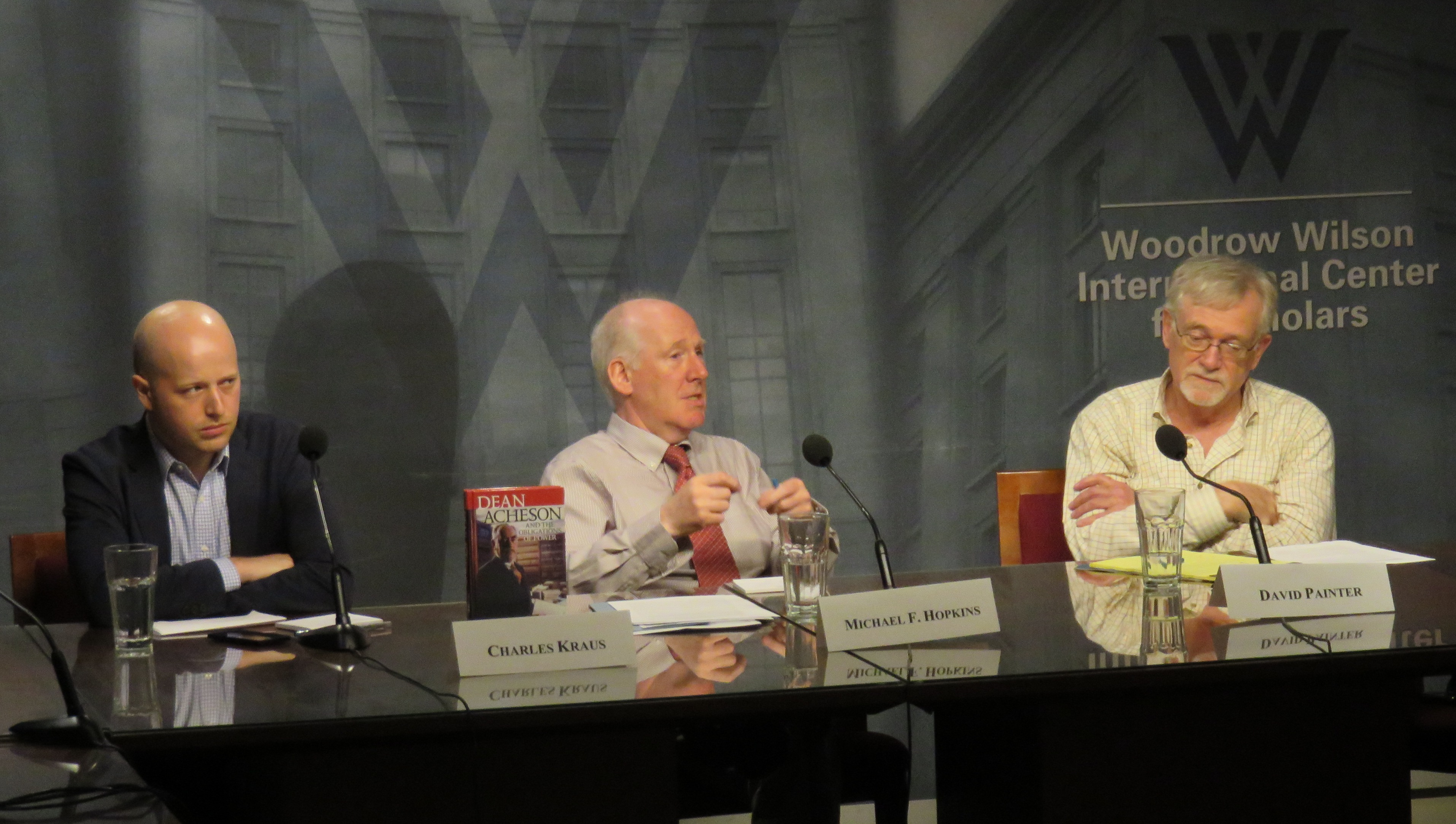
Charles Kraus (Moderator), Michael F. Hopkins (Author) and David S. Painter (Respondent), Book Launch, Dean Acheson and the Obligations of Power, Woodrow Wilson International Center for Scholars, Washington, D.C., 19 June 2017

=== Books and case studies ===
- Origins of the Cold War: An International History (2nd ed.). New York & London: Routledge. 2005. ISBN 978-0-415-34109-7. (Co-editor with Melvyn P. Leffler).
- The Cold War: An International History. London: Routledge. 1999. ISBN 978-0-415-19446-4.
- The United States, Great Britain, and Mossadegh (PDF). Washington, DC: Institute for the Study of Diplomacy. 1993. ISBN 1-56927-332-4.
- Deciding Germany's Future, 1943–1945. Washington, DC: Institute for the Study of Diplomacy. 1989. ISBN 1-56927-323-5.
- The German Question and the Cold War. Washington, DC: Institute for the Study of Diplomacy. 1988. ISBN 1-56927-415-0.
- Allied Relations in Iran: 1941–1945. Washington, DC: Institute for the Study of Diplomacy. 1986. ISBN 1-56927-425-8.
- Oil and the American Century: The Political Economy of US Foreign Oil Policy, 1941–1954. Baltimore, MD: Johns Hopkins University Press. 1986. ISBN 978-0-801-82693-1.
  Published in the UK as Private Power and Public Policy: Multinational Oil Corporations and United States Foreign Policy, 1941–54. London: I.B.Tauris. 1987. ISBN 978-1-850-43021-6.

=== Articles and book chapters ===
- Painter, D. S. (2012). "Oil and the American Century". The Journal of American History. 99 (1): 24–39. doi:10.1093/jahist/jas073.
- "Oil, resources, and the Cold War, 1945–62". In Melvyn P. Leffler & Odd Arne Westad, eds., The Cambridge History of the Cold War, Volume I: Origins (pp. 486–507). Cambridge: Cambridge University Press. 2010. ISBN 978-0-521-83719-4.
- "The Global Environmental Footprint of the U.S. Military, 1789–2003". In Charles E. Closmann, ed., War and the Environment: Military Destruction in the Modern Age (pp. 20–24). College Station, TX: Texas A&M University Press. 2009. ISBN 978-1-603-44115-5. (Co-author with J. R. McNeill).
- Painter, David S. (2009). "The Marshall Plan and Oil". Cold War History. 9 (2): 159–175. doi:10.1080/14682740902871851. S2CID 154074937.
- Painter, David (2006). "A Partial History of the Cold War". Cold War History. 6 (4): 527–534. doi:10.1080/14682740600979295. S2CID 155058853.
- Painter, David s. (2005). "Markets, Technology, and U.S. Foreign Policy". Diplomatic History. 29 (2): 387–391. doi:10.1111/j.1467-7709.2005.00489.x.
- "The End of the Cold War". In Jean-Christophe Agnew & Roy Rosenzweig, eds., A Companion to Post-1945 America (pp. 479–500). Oxford: Blackwell Publishers. 2002. ISBN 978-0-631-22325-2. (Co-author with Thomas Blanton).
- Painter, David S. (1995). "Explaining US Relations with the Third World". Diplomatic History. 19 (3): 525–548. doi:10.1111/j.1467-7709.1995.tb00648.x.
- Painter, David S. (1993). "Oil and World Power". Diplomatic History. 17 (1): 159–170. doi:10.1111/j.1467-7709.1993.tb00167.x.
- Painter, David S. (1991). "International Oil and National Security". Daedalus. 120 (4): 183–206. JSTOR 20025409.
- Painter, David S. (1984). "Oil and the Marshall Plan". Business History Review. 58 (3): 359–383. doi:10.2307/3114553. JSTOR 3114553. S2CID 153880124.

== See also ==
- Baruch Plan
