= United Nations Atomic Energy Commission =

UN commission, 1946 – 1952

The United Nations Atomic Energy Commission (UNAEC) was founded on 24 January 1946 by the very first resolution of the United Nations General Assembly "to deal with the problems raised by the discovery of atomic energy."

The General Assembly asked the Commission to make specific proposals:

(a) for extending between all nations the exchange of basic scientific information for peaceful ends;

(b) for control of atomic energy to the extent necessary to ensure its use only for peaceful purposes;

(c) for the elimination from national armaments of atomic weapons and of all other major weapons adaptable to mass destruction;

(d) for effective safeguards by way of inspection and other means to protect complying States against the hazards of violations and evasions.

On 14 December 1946, the General Assembly passed a follow-up resolution urging an expeditious completion of the report by the Commission as well as its consideration by the United Nations Security Council. The Security Council received the report on 31 December 1946 and passed a resolution on 10 March 1947, "recognizing that any agreement expressed by the members of the Council to the separate portions of the report is preliminary" and requesting a second report to be made. On 4 November 1948, the General Assembly passed a resolution stating that it had examined the first, second and third reports of the Commission and expressed its deep concern at the impasse which had been reached, as shown in its third report.

On 14 June 1946, the United States representative to the Commission, Bernard Baruch, presented the Baruch Plan, wherein the United States (at the time the only state possessing atomic weapons) would destroy its atomic arsenal on the condition that the U.N. imposed controls on atomic development that would not be subject to United Nations Security Council veto. These controls would allow only the peaceful use of atomic energy. The plan was passed by the Commission, but not agreed to by the Soviet Union who abstained on the proposal in the Security Council. Debate on the plan continued into 1948, but by early 1947 it was clear that agreement was unlikely.

The UN General Assembly officially disbanded UNAEC in 1952, although the Commission had been inactive since July 1949.

== See also ==
- Baruch Plan
- Acheson–Lilienthal Report
- International Atomic Energy Agency
- Cold War
- United Nations Security Council Resolution 20
- Álvaro Alberto da Motta e Silva, first president of UNAEC
