= Álvaro Alberto da Motta e Silva =

Brazilian vice admiral and scientist (1889–1976)

Álvaro Alberto
- Álvaro Alberto in 1951
- Born: 22 April 1889; Rio de Janeiro, Empire of Brazil
- Died: 31 January 1976 (aged 86) Rio de Janeiro, Brazil
- Allegiance: Brazil
- Branch: Brazilian Navy
- Service years: 1906—1942
- Rank: Vice admiral
- Conflicts: Revolt of the Lash (WIA); World War I
- Education: Naval School; Polytechnic School of Rio de Janeiro; Ecolé Centrale Téchnique de Bruxelles
- Spouse: Teresa Otero

Álvaro Alberto da Motta e Silva (22 April 1889 – 31 January 1976), was a Brazilian vice admiral and scientist, responsible for the implementation of the Brazilian nuclear program in the 1940s and 1950s.

Álvaro Alberto is considered the most prominent name of the national science focused on nuclear physics, serving as President of the United Nations Atomic Energy Commission between 1946 and 1947, and as President of the Brazilian Academy of Sciences for two terms, from 1935 to 1937 and 1949–51.

== Early career ==
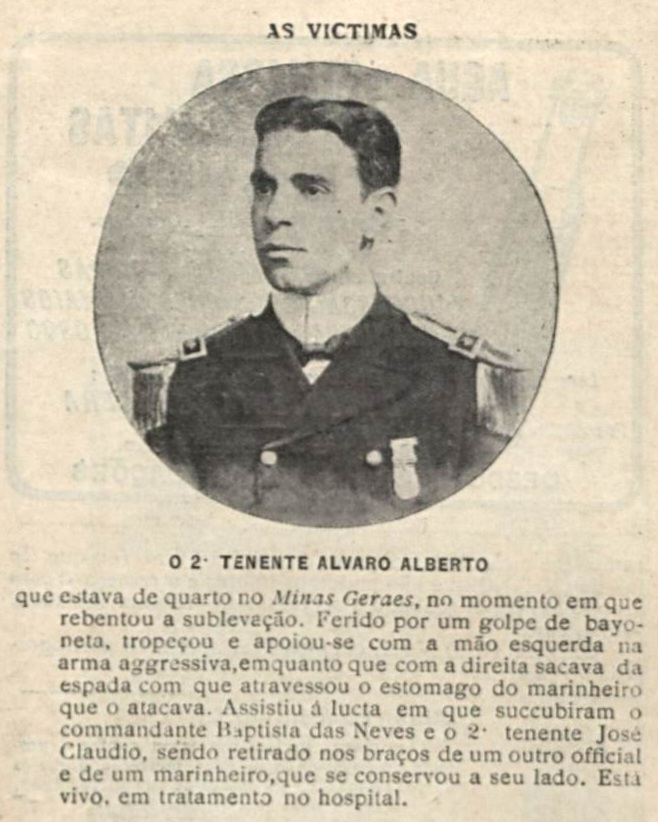
News about Álvaro Alberto, who at the time was being treated in a hospital after being wounded by a bayonet during the Revolt of the Lash. Published in O Malho, No. 429, 3 December 1910

Son of a doctor and politician, he joined the Brazilian Naval School in 1906. He became involved in the Revolt of the Lash in 1910, being the first officer to be seriously injured on the night of 22 November. Álvaro Alberto joined the Polytechnic School in 1911, after becoming interested in the science of explosives.

In 1916, he served in the position of teacher of chemistry and explosives at the Naval School, including the study of nuclear physics in his curriculum in the year of 1939. During his career at the Polytechnic School, he invented rupturite and alexandrinite explosives and polyvalent anti-fouling paints.

== President of the UNAEC ==
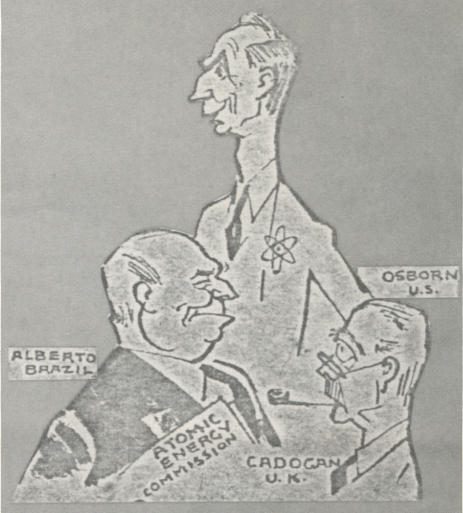
Caricature of Álvaro Alberto, Frederick Osborn and Alexander Cadogan at UNAEC in 1946

He was appointed Brazil's representative on the UNAEC in 1946, becoming a staunch opponent of the proposals of the Baruch Plan, that could give Americans complete control of the global reserves of thorium and uranium, used later for the mass production of nuclear weapons. Álvaro Alberto called the U.S. policy an "attempted expropriation".

In the same year, he was unanimously elected as President of the UNAEC, and served as a mediator in disputes over nuclear technology between 1946 and 1947.

== Idealization of the Brazilian Nuclear Program ==
After the discovery of the first American nuclear weapons in 1945, Brazil quickly became one of the largest exporters of uranium to the United States. Álvaro Alberto then planned to create a governmental institution, with the main purpose of increasing, supporting and coordinating national scientific research related to nuclear technology, in addition to controlling exports of strategic nuclear raw materials.

From 1947, Álvaro Alberto made several trips to other countries, with the purpose of scientific cooperation in the nuclear area. In the 1950s, he received authorization from Presidents Getúlio Vargas and Juscelino Kubitschek, to acquire all phases of the nuclear energy production in France and West Germany, with strong American opposition, starting the Brazilian Nuclear Program.

In 1955, Brazil signed nuclear cooperation agreements with the U.S., called the "Atoms of Peace" agreements, and was successful in building the first national nuclear reactor in 1962.

== Legacy ==
In addition to serving at UNAEC and as President of the Brazilian Academy of Sciences, he founded the Brazilian Chemical Society in 1922, and the National Council for Scientific and Technological Development in 1951.

Álvaro Alberto met important names for the global scientific community during his career, such as Otto Hahn, Albert Einstein, Alberto Santos-Dumont, Alexander Cadogan, Frederick Osborn among others, leaving a great legacy for the Brazilian and global scientific community, in defending cooperation in nuclear technology for peaceful purposes.

In tribute, the nuclear power plant of Angra dos Reis, was named Admiral Álvaro Alberto Nuclear Power Plant by then President Emílio Garrastazu Médici in the 1970s. He also is the patron of the No. 10 chair of the Rotarian Academy of Letters of the City of the Rio de Janeiro. The Brazilian Navy also named the country's first nuclear submarine, scheduled for launch in 2029–30, as Álvaro Alberto.

== Publications ==
- Rationalization of Equations to "n" Square Radicals Without Rational Terms (1916)
- The Problem of Words and Their Current Solution (1939)
- The Contribution of the Jesuits to the Physical Sciences (1940)
- On the Edge of the Science (1960)
- Science and Technology (1962)
- Notes and Communications (1962)
