= Acheson–Lilienthal Report =

1946 American proposal to control nuclear energy to avoid war

The Report on the International Control of Atomic Energy was written by a committee chaired by Dean Acheson and David Lilienthal in 1946 and is generally known as the Acheson–Lilienthal Report or Plan. The report was an important American document that appeared just before the intensification of the early Cold War. It proposed the international control of nuclear weapons and the avoidance of future nuclear warfare. A version, the Baruch Plan, was vetoed by the Soviets at the United Nations.

== Historical context ==
Two schools of thought concerning nuclear weapons emerged in the United States immediately after the end of World War II. One school, which had Secretary of War Henry Stimson as its chief proponent, believed that the apparent secrets of the atomic bomb were scientific in nature, and could not be monopolised forever. They further felt that to hold the bomb ostentatiously in reserve but to negotiate with the Soviet Union not to develop one would simply drive the Soviets into developing their own weapon to restore the balance of power.

The other school included men like Secretary of State James F. Byrnes, who felt that the US monopoly on atomic weapons had been honestly earned and should not be surrendered. In their view, the Soviets understood only power, which could be met only with nuclear weapons.

President Harry S. Truman was divided between the two positions. He was distrustful of the Soviet Union but still did not want to lead the world down a path to destruction. He continued to solicit views from both sides. Stimson resigned in September 1945, and thereafter, the task of promoting his approach fell primarily on Under Secretary of State and later Secretary of State Dean Acheson.

A proposal to pass the responsibility for the control of atomic energy to a United Nations Atomic Energy Commission was endorsed by both the Americans and the Soviets in 1945. They had the forum, but the United States had not yet articulated a policy that it wished the new commission to adopt. To resolve the problem, Acheson was appointed to head a committee to determine US policy on atomic energy, the Committee on Atomic Energy, set up on January 7, 1946. A letter of transmittal at the beginning of the Report embodies the comments that Acheson's Committee made on the unanimous findings and recommendations of the Board of Consultants.

The other members of the committee were scientists James Conant and Vannevar Bush, the director of the Office of Scientific Research and Development, which controlled the Manhattan Project, and John McCloy, and General Leslie R. Groves, who had been the military officer in charge of the Manhattan Project. Acheson decided that the committee needed technical advice and so he appointed a board of consultants with David Lilienthal, the well-regarded chairman of the Tennessee Valley Authority, as chairman. He also appointed J. Robert Oppenheimer, scientific leader of the Manhattan Project, who provided influential advice. Oppenheimer's contribution lay in an idea to police the production of atomic weapons from monitoring source mines for uranium.

== Overview ==
On March 16, 1946, the committee's report was presented to the State Department, which released it to the public on March 28. The Report on the International Control of Atomic Energy soon became known as the Acheson–Lilienthal Report. The primary message of the report was that control of atomic energy through inspections and policing operations was unlikely to succeed. Instead, the report proposed that all fissile material be owned by an international agency to be called the Atomic Development Authority, which would release small amounts to individual nations for the development of peaceful uses of atomic energy.

In the first years of the atomic era, it was generally believed that the great obstacle facing a would-be developer of an atomic bomb was the acquisition of sufficient fissile material. In response, the Acheson–Lilienthal Report proposed that the complete path from the uranium and thorium mines to post production be under international ownership.

In addition, the report proposed that the United States abandon its monopoly on atomic weapons, revealing what it knew to the Soviet Union, in exchange for a mutual agreement against the development of additional atomic bombs. This was to prove too controversial. Although Truman accepted the report in general, his appointment of financier Bernard Baruch to carry the proposal forward in the United Nations led to demands for punishment for violations and that those penalties could not be vetoed by the United Nations Security Council, as well as unrestricted inspections within the Soviet Union but still insisting that the Soviets should agree not to develop the bomb. Those were modifications that neither Acheson nor Lilienthal accepted. That, combined with US continued insistence on retaining the bomb until it was satisfied with the effectiveness of international control, ultimately led to the plan's rejection by the Soviets to the surprise of no one.

== Authors ==
The consultants heading the project comprised Chester Barnard, J. Robert Oppenheimer, Charles A. Thomas, Harry A. Winne, and David E. Lilienthal, while the official authors, who had worked on the Manhattan Project and included some of the United States' top scientists, comprised Luis Walter Alvarez, Robert F. Bacher, Manson Benedict, Hans Bethe, Arthur Compton, Farrington Daniels, J. Robert Oppenheimer, John R. Ruhoff, G. T. Seaborg, H. J. Brackerman, Frank Spedding, Charles A. Thomas, and Walter Zinn. The report itself was written largely by Oppenheimer.

== See also ==
- Baruch Plan
- Nuclear disarmament
