= Baruch Plan =

1946 US proposal for international control of nuclear energy

The Baruch Plan was a proposal put forward by the United States government on 14 June 1946 to the United Nations Atomic Energy Commission (UNAEC) during its first meeting. Bernard Baruch wrote the bulk of the proposal, based on the March 1946 Acheson–Lilienthal Report and it was presented by UN Secretary General Trygve Lie. The United States, Great Britain and Canada had called for an international organization to regulate the use of atomic energy, and President Truman responded by asking Undersecretary of State Dean Acheson and David E. Lilienthal to draw up a plan. The Soviet Union, fearing the plan would preserve the American nuclear monopoly, declined in December 1946 in the United Nations Security Council to endorse Baruch's version of the proposal, and the Cold War phase of the nuclear arms race followed.

== Description ==
In the Plan, the US agreed to decommission all of its atomic weapons and transfer nuclear technology on the condition that all other countries pledged not to produce atomic weapons and agreed to an adequate system of inspection, including monitoring, policing, and sanctions. The Plan also proposed to internationalize fission energy via an International Atomic Development Authority, which would exercise a monopoly of mining uranium and thorium, refining the ores, owning materials, and constructing and operating nuclear plants. This Authority would fall under the United Nations Atomic Energy Commission. In short, the plan proposed to:

1. extend between all countries the exchange of basic scientific information for peaceful conclusions;
2. implement control of nuclear power to the extent necessary to ensure its use only for peaceful purposes;
3. eliminate from national armaments atomic weapons and all other major weapons adaptable to mass destruction; and
4. establish effective safeguards by way of inspection and other means to protect complying States against the hazards of violations and evasions.

In presenting his plan to the United Nations, Baruch stated:

We are here to make a choice between the quick and the dead. That is our business. Behind the black portent of the new atomic age lies a hope which, seized upon with faith, can work our salvation. If we fail, then we have damned every man to be the slave of fear. Let us not deceive ourselves; we must elect world peace or (elect) world destruction.

== Reaction ==
The Soviets rejected the Baruch Plan and suggested a counter-proposal on the grounds that the United Nations was dominated by the United States and its allies in Western Europe, and could therefore not be trusted to exercise authority over atomic weaponry in an evenhanded manner. (Nationalist China, a UN Security Council member with veto privileges, was anti-communist and aligned with the US at this time.) The USSR counter-proposal insisted that America eliminate its own nuclear weapons first before considering any proposals for a system of controls and inspections.

Although the Soviets showed further interest in the cause of arms control after they became a nuclear power in 1949, and particularly after the death of Stalin in 1953, the issue of the Soviet Union submitting to international inspection was always a thorny one, upon which many attempts at nuclear arms control stalled. Crucially, the Baruch Plan suggested that none of the permanent members of the United Nations Security Council would be able to veto a decision to punish culprits. Because of the difficulties in monitoring and policing, as well as Stalin's ambition to develop atomic weapons, although negotiations over the Baruch Plan and the Soviet counter-proposal continued in the UNAEC until 1948, the Plan was not seriously advanced later than the end of 1947. Throughout the negotiations, the USSR was fast-tracking its own atomic bomb project, and the United States was continuing its own weapons development and production. With the failure of the Plan, both nations embarked on accelerated programs of weapons development, innovation, production, and testing as part of the overall nuclear arms race of the Cold War.

Bertrand Russell urged control of nuclear weapons in the 1940s and early 1950s to avoid the likelihood of a general nuclear war, and initially felt hopeful when the Baruch Proposal was made. In late 1948, he suggested that "the remedy might be the threat of immediate war by the United States on Russia for the purpose of forcing nuclear disarmament on her." Later he thought less well of the Baruch Proposal as "Congress insisted upon the insertion of clauses which it was known that the Russians would not accept." In his 1961 book Has Man a Future?, Russell described the Baruch plan as follows:

The United States Government... did attempt... to give effect to some of the ideas which the atomic scientists had suggested. In 1946, it presented to the world what is now called "The Baruch Plan", which had very great merits and showed considerable generosity, when it is remembered that America still had an unbroken nuclear monopoly... Unfortunately, there were features of the Baruch Proposal which Russia found unacceptable, as, indeed, was to be expected. It was Stalin's Russia, flushed with pride in the victory over the Germans, suspicious (not without reason) of the Western Powers, and aware that in the United Nations it could almost always be outvoted.

== Historical significance ==
Scholars such as David S. Painter, Melvyn Leffler, and James Carroll have questioned whether or not the Baruch Plan was a legitimate effort to achieve global cooperation on nuclear control. The Baruch Plan is often cited as a pivotal moment in history in works promoting internationalizing nuclear power or revisiting nuclear arms control. In philosopher Nick Bostrom's 2014 work Superintelligence: Paths, Dangers, Strategies, he cited the Baruch Plan as part of an argument that a future power possessing superintelligence that obtained a sufficient strategic advantage would employ it to establish a benign 'singleton' or form of global unity.^{:89}

== See also ==
- Acheson–Lilienthal Report
- Atoms for Peace
- Cold War
- International Thermonuclear Experimental Reactor (ITER)
- Nuclear arms race
- Russell–Einstein Manifesto
- Science diplomacy
- United Nations Atomic Energy Commission (UNAEC)
