= Bethe =

Bethe is a given name and surname. Notable people with the name include:

- Albrecht Bethe (1872–1954), German physiologist and father of Hans Bethe
- Erich Bethe (1863–1940), German philologist
- Hans Bethe (1906–2005), German-American nuclear physicist
- Kitty Bethe (born 1960), one professional name of Kitty Cooper, American bridge player
- Margarethe Loewe-Bethe (1859–1932), German painter
- Mickaël Bethe-Selassié (1951–2020), Ethiopian artist
- Bethe Correia (born 1983), Brazilian mixed martial artist

== See also ==
- 30828 Bethe
- Bethel (disambiguation)
