= Vonjiniaina =

Malagasy contemporary artist

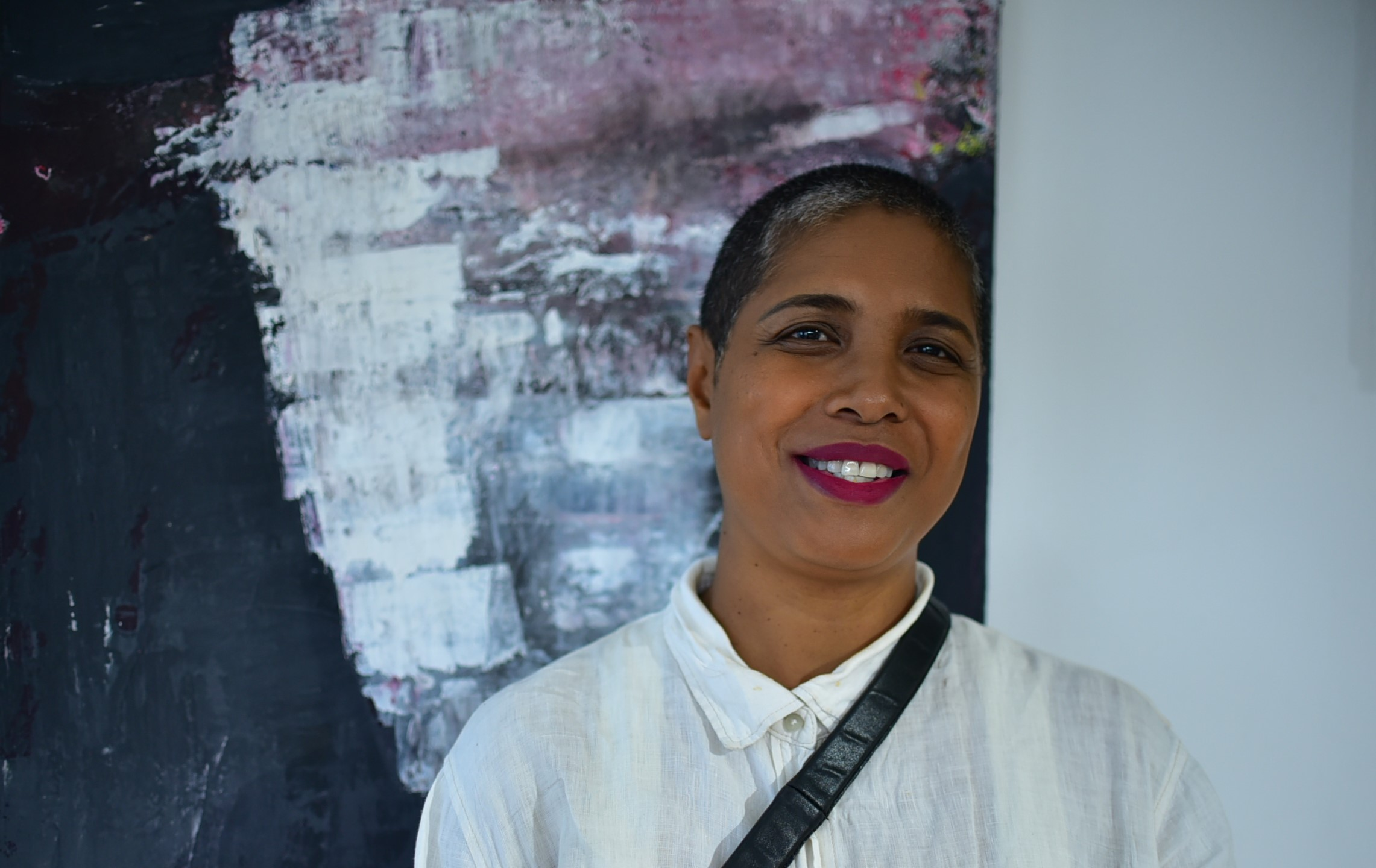
- Born: Vonjiniaina Annie Ratovonirina; 26 June 1975 (age 50); Madagascar
- Education: Robert-Schuman University
- Known for: Painting, Sculpture
- Notable work: Paroles de boue
- Awards: Gold medal in sculpture Jeux de la Francophonie 2005

Vonjiniaina (born Vonjiniaina Annie Ratovonirina; June 26, 1975), is a contemporary Malagasy artist, gold medalist in sculpture at the fifth Jeux de la Francophonie in 2005.

== Biography ==
Born to diplomatic parents, Vonjiniaina moved to Germany at the age of 13. She then went to Illkirch-Graffenstaden to pursue studies in marketing at the Robert-Schuman University Institute of Technology.

Vonjiniaina began her artistic career with the exhibition De l'Ame à la Matière (From Soul to Matter) and mainly received attention following her series of sculptures, Paroles de boue (Words of Mud). This group of works appeared in multiple exhibitions internationally. She has exhibited at the Dakar Biennale (2002), the Hôtel de Ville (2003), the Musei Di San Salvatore in Lauro in Rome (2012), and the Gallery of African Art in London (2014).

Vonjiniaina works mainly in landscape, drawing inspiration from Madagascar's cultural heritage: "Dans mon travail, il y a toujours la terre, d'abord comme matière mais aussi comme essence de l'humain. Dans le travail de la terre existe un vecteur spirituel qui lie géographie et histoire, espace et temps, homme et Dieu, réel et imaginaire, âme et matière."

== Exhibitions ==
=== Painting ===
- 1999: De l'Ame à la Matière, galerie Art Déco, Antananarivo, Madagascar
- 2001: Sens Cri at the Art Deco gallery in Antananarivo, Madagascar
- 2003: Latitudes, l'Hôtel de ville, Paris
- 2006: Paroles de Boue, Institut Français de Madagascar
- 2007: Angaredona, Alliance Française de Tananarive, Madagascar
- 2011: Une Nuit pour Reconstruire un Village à Madagascar, Paris
- 2012: Fabula in Art, at the Musei Di San Salvatore in Lauro, Rome and Murs de Silence at Is'Art Galerie, Madagascar
- 2014: Pop-up Africa at the Gallery of African Art, London

=== Sculpture ===
- 2002: Installation, Dakar Biennale, Senegal
- 2003: Padaratana, Institut Français de Madagascar
- 2005: Installation, Jeux de la Francophonie, Niamey, Niger
- 2006: Elabakana, Madagascar and residency workshop with sculptor Michael Bethe Sélassié
- 2007: 30 et Presque Songe, with Joël Andrianomearisoa, Madagascar
- 2009: Tsinjo-Dia at Espace Rarihasina, Antananarivo, Madagascar

=== Other media ===
- 2003: Scenography for the Contemporary Dance Biennial of Africa and the Indian Ocean, Madagascar
- 2003: Member of the jury for the second edition of the Short Film Festival in Madagascar
- 2007: Scenography of the Africa and Indian Ocean Biennial of Photography, in Madagascar
- 2010: Scenography of Sar'nao Month of Photography in Madasgascar
- 2013: Co-writer for Le Mythe d'Ibonia , at the Alliance Française de Tananarive, with Hiary Rapanoelina and Henri Randrianerenana

== Awards ==
- Gold medal in sculpture, Jeux de la Francophonie, 2005
- Officer of the Order of Arts, Letters and Culture. Madagascar, 2012
