= Partial Nuclear Test Ban Treaty =

1963 international agreement

Treaty Banning Nuclear Weapon Tests in the Atmosphere, in Outer Space and Under Water
Participation in the Partial Test Ban Treaty
Signed and ratified
Acceded or succeeded
Only signed
Non-signatory
- Type: Arms control
- Signed: 5 August 1963
- Location: Moscow, Soviet Union
- Effective: 10 October 1963
- Condition: Ratification by the Soviet Union, United Kingdom, and United States
- Parties: 126, plus 10 signed but not ratified (see complete list)
- Depositaries: Governments of the United States of America, United Kingdom of Great Britain and Northern Ireland, and Union of Soviet Socialist Republics
- Languages: English and Russian

Full text
- Partial Test Ban Treaty at Wikisource

The Partial Test Ban Treaty (PTBT), formally known as the 1963 Treaty Banning Nuclear Weapon Tests in the Atmosphere, in Outer Space and Under Water, prohibited all test detonations of nuclear weapons except for those conducted underground. It is also abbreviated as the Limited Test Ban Treaty (LTBT) and Nuclear Test Ban Treaty (NTBT), though the latter may also refer to the Comprehensive Nuclear-Test-Ban Treaty (CTBT), which succeeded the PTBT for ratifying parties.

Negotiations initially focused on a comprehensive ban, but that was abandoned because of technical questions surrounding the detection of underground tests and Soviet concerns over the intrusiveness of proposed verification methods. The impetus for the test ban was provided by rising public anxiety over the magnitude of nuclear tests, particularly tests of new thermonuclear weapons (hydrogen bombs), and the resulting nuclear fallout. A test ban was also seen as a means of slowing nuclear proliferation and the nuclear arms race. Though the PTBT did not halt proliferation or the arms race, its enactment did coincide with a substantial decline in the concentration of radioactive particles in the atmosphere.

The PTBT was signed by the governments of the Soviet Union, the United Kingdom, and the United States in Moscow on 5 August 1963 before it was opened for signature by other countries. The treaty formally went into effect on 10 October 1963. Since then, 123 other states have become party to the treaty. Ten states have signed but not ratified the treaty.

The treaty contributed to a lasting taboo on non-underground tests. Non-signatories France and China continued atmospheric testing until 1974 and 1980. Signatories Israel and South Africa may have violated it with the 1979 Vela incident. Since 1980, all declared nuclear weapons states have made underground tests, and there have been no suspected non-underground tests.

== Background ==
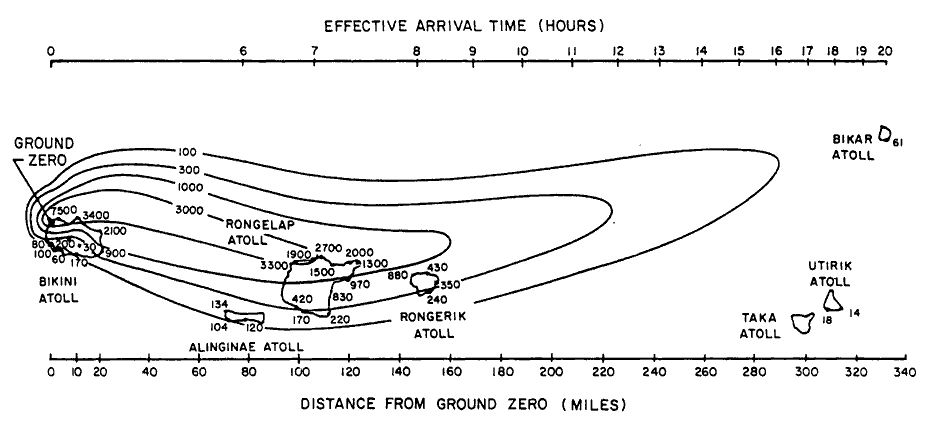
Castle Bravo fallout plume

The primary motivation for the treaty stemmed from growing public concern over radioactive fallout from above-ground and underwater nuclear testing, especially as the power of nuclear devices continued to increase. Additionally, there was widespread apprehension about the broader environmental damage caused by such testing. In 1952–53, both the United States and the Soviet Union detonated their first thermonuclear weapons (hydrogen bombs), which were significantly more powerful than the atomic bombs that had been tested and deployed since the Trinity test in 1945. In 1954, the U.S. conducted the Castle Bravo test at Bikini Atoll as part of Operation Castle, which resulted in a yield of 15 megatons of TNT, more than double the expected yield. This unexpectedly high yield caused widespread radioactive fallout, leading to severe environmental and human consequences. The Castle Bravo test resulted in the worst radiological event in US history as radioactive particles spread over more than 11,000 square kilometers (4,200 mi^{2}), affected inhabited areas (including Rongelap Atoll and Utirik Atoll), and sickened Japanese fishermen aboard the Lucky Dragon upon whom "ashes of death" had rained. In the same year, a Soviet test sent radioactive particles over Japan. Around the same time, victims of the atomic bombing of Hiroshima visited the US for medical care, which attracted significant public attention. In 1961, the Soviet Union tested the Tsar Bomba, which had a yield of 50 megatons and remains the most powerful human-made explosion in history, though due to use of a lead tamper, fallout was relatively limited. Between 1951 and 1958, the US conducted 166 atmospheric tests, the Soviet Union conducted 82, and Britain conducted 21; only 22 underground tests were conducted in this period (all by the US).

== Negotiations ==
=== Early efforts ===
In 1945, Britain and Canada made an early call for international discussions on the control of atomic power, anticipating the global implications of nuclear technology. At the time, the U.S. had not yet developed a cohesive policy or strategy regarding nuclear weapons. Vannevar Bush, who had been instrumental in initiating and overseeing the Manhattan Project, sought to leverage this moment to advance his long-term goal of banning nuclear weapons production, despite the project's role in developing them. As a first step in this direction, Bush proposed an international agency dedicated to nuclear control. Bush unsuccessfully argued in 1952 that the US pursue a test ban agreement with the Soviet Union before testing its first thermonuclear weapon, but his interest in international controls was echoed in the 1946 Acheson–Lilienthal Report, which had been commissioned by President Harry S. Truman to help construct US nuclear weapons policy. J. Robert Oppenheimer, who had led Los Alamos National Laboratory during the Manhattan Project, exerted significant influence over the report, particularly in its recommendation of an international body that would control production of and research on the world's supply of uranium and thorium. A version of the Acheson-Lilienthal plan was presented to the United Nations Atomic Energy Commission (UNAEC) as the Baruch Plan in June 1946. The Baruch Plan proposed that an International Atomic Development Authority would control all research on and material and equipment involved in the production of atomic energy. Though Dwight D. Eisenhower, then the Chief of Staff of the United States Army, was not a significant figure in the Truman administration on nuclear questions, he did support Truman's nuclear control policy, including the Baruch Plan's provision for an international control agency, provided that the control system was accompanied by "a system of free and complete inspection."

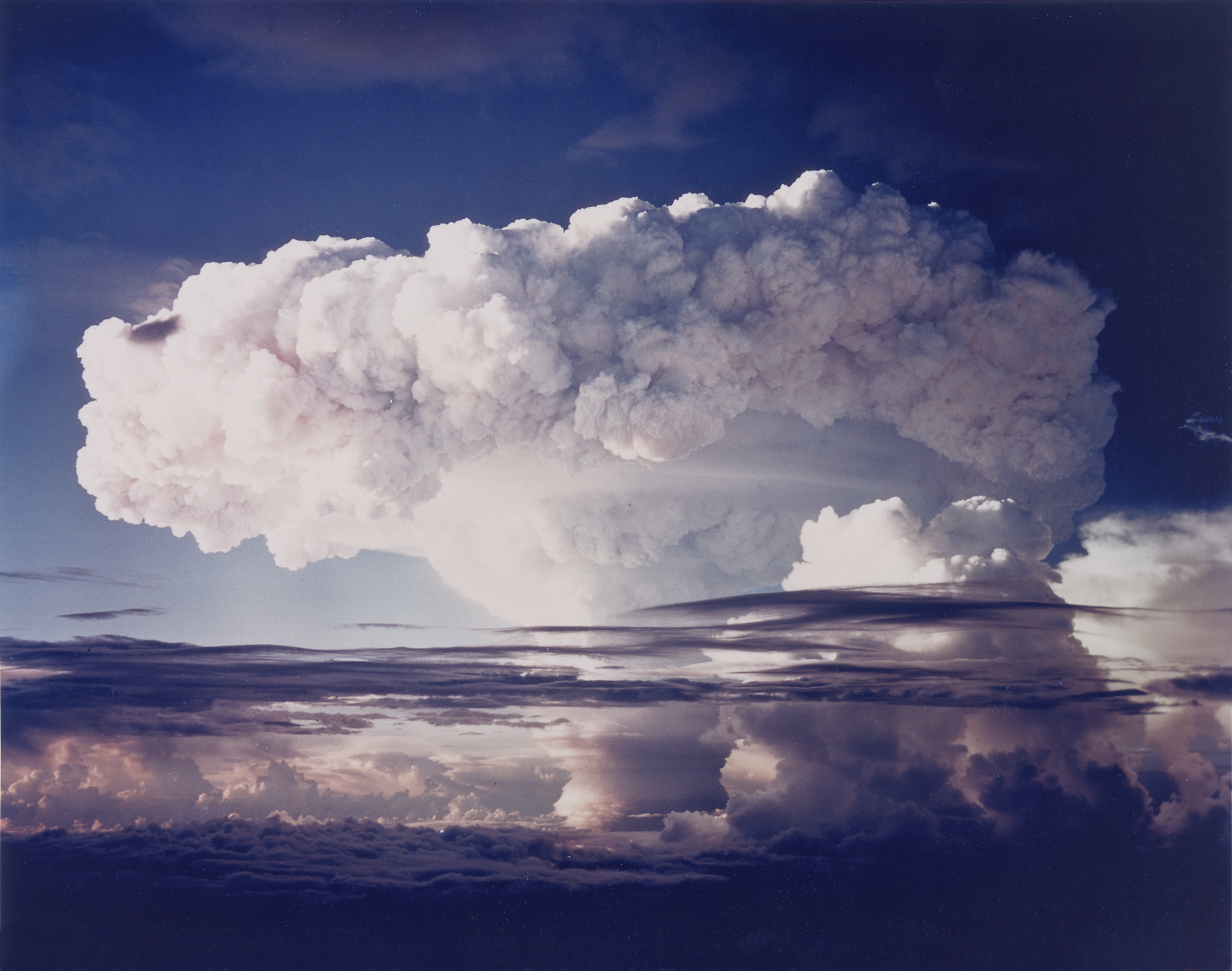
The Ivy Mike test of 1952, an early thermonuclear detonation

The Soviet Union dismissed the Baruch Plan as a US attempt to secure its nuclear dominance, and called for the US to halt weapons production and release technical information on its program. The Acheson–Lilienthal paper and Baruch Plan would serve as the basis for US policy into the 1950s. Between 1947 and 1954, the US and Soviet Union discussed their demands within the United Nations Commission for Conventional Disarmament. A series of events in 1954, including the Castle Bravo test and spread of fallout from a Soviet test over Japan, redirected the international discussion on nuclear policy. Additionally, by 1954, both US and Soviet Union had assembled large nuclear stockpiles, reducing hopes of complete disarmament. In the early years of the Cold War, the US approach to nuclear control reflected a strain between an interest in controlling nuclear weapons and a belief that dominance in the nuclear arena, particularly given the size of Soviet conventional forces, was critical to US security. Interest in nuclear control and efforts to stall proliferation of weapons to other states grew as the Soviet Union's nuclear capabilities increased.

==== After Castle Bravo: 1954–1958 ====
In 1954, just weeks after the Castle Bravo test, Indian Prime Minister Jawaharlal Nehru made the first public call for a "standstill agreement" on nuclear testing. Nehru viewed a testing moratorium as a crucial first step toward broader and more comprehensive arms control agreements, reflecting his commitment to nuclear disarmament and global peace. In the same year, the British Labour Party, then led by Clement Attlee, called on the UN to ban testing of thermonuclear weapons. 1955 marks the beginning of test-ban negotiations, as Soviet leader Nikita Khrushchev first proposed talks on the subject in February 1955. On 10 May 1955, the Soviet Union proposed a test ban before the UN Disarmament Commission's "Committee of Five" (Britain, Canada, France, the Soviet Union, and the US). This proposal, which closely reflected a prior Anglo-French proposal, was initially part of a comprehensive disarmament proposal meant to reduce conventional arms levels and eliminate nuclear weapons. Despite the closeness of the Soviet proposal to earlier Western proposals, the US reversed its position on the provisions and rejected the Soviet offer "in the absence of more general control agreements," including limits on the production of fissionable material and protections against a surprise nuclear strike. The May 1955 proposal is now seen as evidence of Khrushchev's "new approach" to foreign policy, as Khrushchev sought to mend relations with the West. The proposal would serve as the basis of the Soviet negotiating position through 1957.

Eisenhower had supported nuclear testing after World War II. In 1947, he rejected arguments by Stafford L. Warren, the Manhattan Project's chief physician, concerning the detrimental health effects of atmospheric testing, agreeing instead with James Bryant Conant, a chemist and participant in the Manhattan Project, who was skeptical of Warren's then-theoretical claims. Warren's arguments were lent credence in the scientific community and public by the Castle Bravo test of 1954. Eisenhower, as president, first explicitly expressed interest in a comprehensive test ban that year, arguing before the National Security Council, "We could put [the Russians] on the spot if we accepted a moratorium ... Everybody seems to think that we're skunks, saber-rattlers and warmongers. We ought not miss any chance to make clear our peaceful objectives." Then-Secretary of State John Foster Dulles had responded skeptically to the limited arms-control suggestion of Nehru, whose proposal for a test ban was discarded by the National Security Council for being "not practical." Harold Stassen, Eisenhower's special assistant for disarmament, argued that the US should prioritize a test ban as a first step towards comprehensive arms control, conditional on the Soviet Union accepting on-site inspections, over full disarmament. Stassen's suggestion was dismissed by others in the administration over fears that the Soviet Union would be able to conduct secret tests. On the advice of Dulles, Atomic Energy Commission (AEC) chairman Lewis Strauss, and Secretary of Defense Charles Erwin Wilson, Eisenhower rejected the idea of considering a test ban outside general disarmament efforts. During the 1952 and 1956 presidential elections, Eisenhower fended off challenger Adlai Stevenson, who ran in large part on support for a test ban.

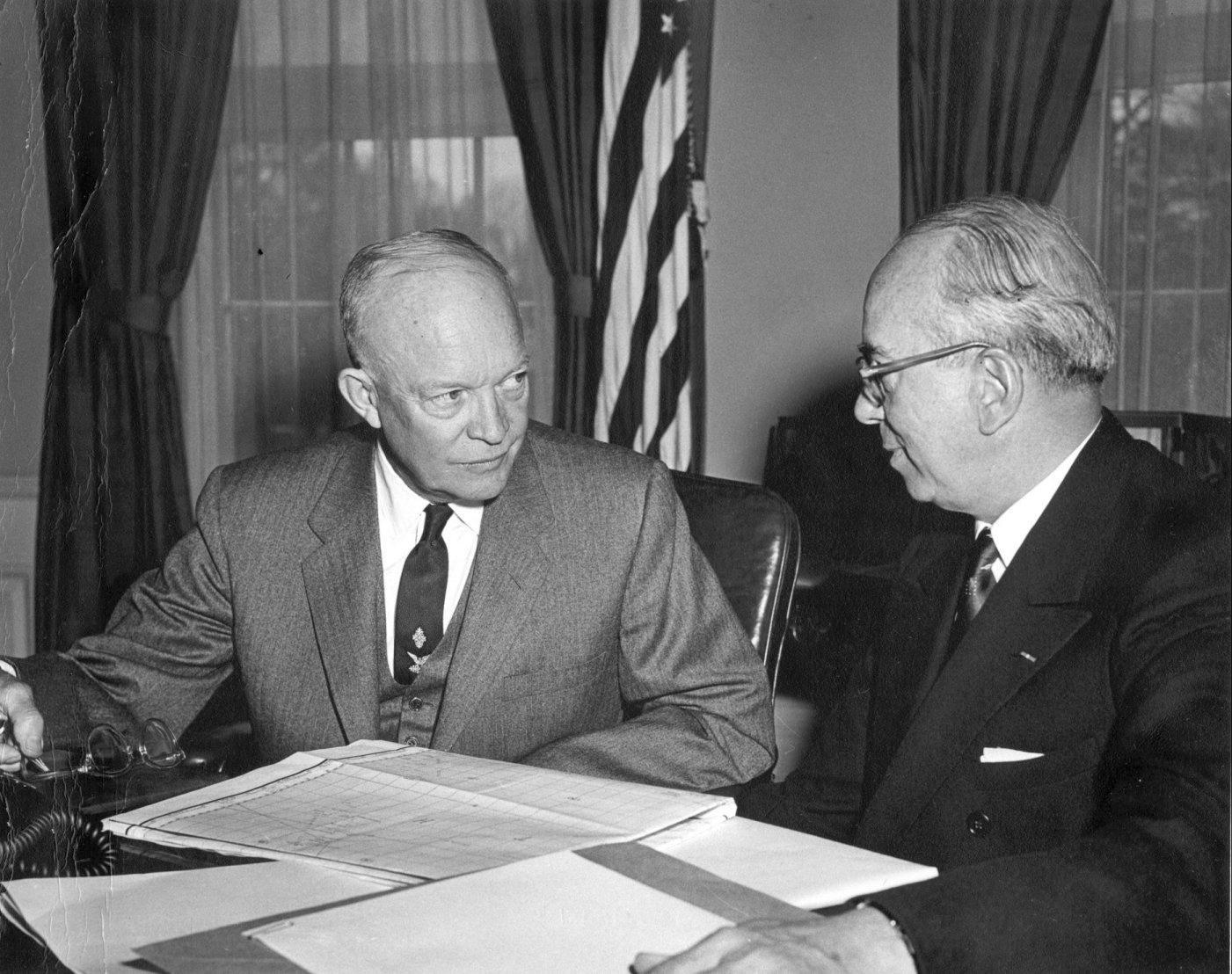
Eisenhower and Strauss discuss Operation Castle, 1954

The British governments of 1954–58 (under Conservatives Winston Churchill, Anthony Eden, and Harold Macmillan) also quietly resisted a test ban, despite the British public favoring a deal, until the US Congress approved expanded nuclear collaboration in 1958 and until after Britain had tested its first hydrogen bombs. In their view, testing was necessary if the UK nuclear program were to continue to develop. This opposition was tempered by concern that resistance to a test ban might lead the US and Soviet Union to pursue an agreement without Britain having any say in the matter.

Members of the Soviet military–industrial complex also opposed a test ban, though some scientists, including Igor Kurchatov, were supportive of antinuclear efforts. France, which was in the midst of developing its own nuclear weapon, also firmly opposed a test ban in the late 1950s.

The proliferation of thermonuclear weapons coincided with a rise in public concern about nuclear fallout debris contaminating food sources, particularly the threat of high levels of strontium-90 in milk (see the Baby Tooth Survey). This survey was a scientist and citizen led campaign which used "modern media advocacy techniques to communicate complex issues" to inform public discourse. Its research findings confirmed a significant build-up of strontium-90 in bones of babies and helped galvanise public support for a ban on atmospheric nuclear testing in the US. Lewis Strauss and Edward Teller, dubbed the "father of the hydrogen bomb," both sought to tamp down on these fears, arguing that fallout [at the dose levels of US exposure] were fairly harmless and that a test ban would enable the Soviet Union to surpass the US in nuclear capabilities. Teller also suggested that testing was necessary to develop nuclear weapons that produced less fallout. Support in the US public for a test ban to continue to grow from 20% in 1954 to 63% by 1957. Moreover, widespread antinuclear protests were organized and led by theologian and Nobel Peace Prize laureate Albert Schweitzer, whose appeals were endorsed by Pope Pius XII, and Linus Pauling, the latter of whom organized an anti-test petition signed by more than 9,000 scientists across 43 countries (including the infirm and elderly Albert Einstein).

The AEC would eventually concede, as well, that even low levels of radiation were harmful. It was a combination of rising public support for a test ban and the shock of the 1957 Soviet Sputnik launch that encouraged Eisenhower to take steps towards a test ban in 1958.

There was also increased environmental concern in the Soviet Union. In the mid-1950s, Soviet scientists began taking regular radiation readings near Leningrad, Moscow, and Odessa and collected data on the prevalence of strontium-90, which indicated that strontium-90 levels in western Russia approximately matched those in the eastern US. Rising Soviet concern was punctuated in September 1957 by the Kyshtym disaster, which forced the evacuation of 10,000 people after an explosion at a nuclear plant. Around the same time, 219 Soviet scientists signed Pauling's antinuclear petition. Soviet political elites did not share the concerns of others in the Soviet Union. However; Kurchatov unsuccessfully called on Khrushchev to halt testing in 1958.

On 14 June 1957, following Eisenhower's suggestion that existing detection measures were inadequate to ensure compliance, the Soviet Union put forth a plan for a two-to-three-year testing moratorium. The moratorium would be overseen by an international commission reliant on national monitoring stations, but, importantly, would involve no on-the-ground inspections. Eisenhower initially saw the deal as favorable, but eventually came to see otherwise. In particular, Strauss and Teller, as well as Ernest Lawrence and Mark Muir Mills, protested the offer. At a meeting with Eisenhower in the White House, the group argued that testing was necessary for the US to eventually develop bombs that produced no fallout ("clean bombs"). The group repeated the oft-cited fact, which was supported by Freeman Dyson, that the Soviet Union could conduct secret nuclear tests. In 1958, at the request of Igor Kurchatov, Soviet nuclear physicist and weapons designer Andrei Sakharov published a pair of widely circulated academic papers challenging the claim of Teller and others that a clean, fallout-free nuclear bomb could be developed, due to the formation of carbon-14 when nuclear devices are detonated in the air. A one-megaton clean bomb, Sakharov estimated, would cause 6,600 deaths over 8,000 years, figures derived largely from estimates on the quantity of carbon-14 generated from atmospheric nitrogen and the contemporary risk models at the time, along with the assumption that the world population is "thirty billion persons" in a few thousand years. In 1961, Sakharov was part of the design team for a 50 megaton "clean bomb", which has become known as the Tsar Bomba, detonated over the island of Novaya Zemlya.

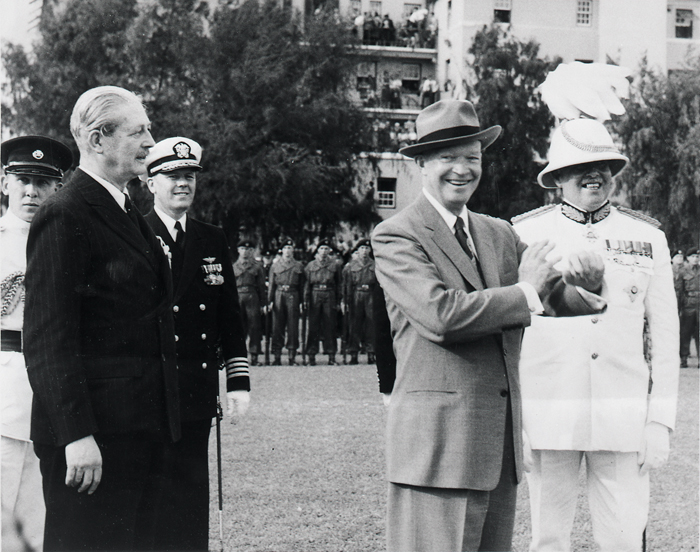
Macmillan (second from left) with Eisenhower in March 1957

In the spring of 1957, the US National Security Council had explored including a one-year test moratorium and a "cut-off" of fissionable-material production in a "partial" disarmament plan. The British government, then led by Macmillan, had yet to fully endorse a test ban. Accordingly, it pushed the US to demand that the production cut-off be closely timed with the testing moratorium, betting that the Soviet Union would reject this. London also encouraged the US to delay its disarmament plan, in part by moving the start of the moratorium back to November 1958. At the same time, Macmillan linked British support for a test ban to a revision of the Atomic Energy Act of 1946 (McMahon Act), which prohibited sharing of nuclear information with foreign governments. Eisenhower, eager to mend ties with Britain following the Suez Crisis of 1956, was receptive to Macmillan's conditions, but the AEC and the congressional Joint Committee on Atomic Energy were firmly opposed. It was not until after Sputnik in late 1957 that Eisenhower quickly moved to expand nuclear collaboration with the UK via presidential directives and the establishment of bilateral committees on nuclear matters. In early 1958, Eisenhower publicly stated that amendments to the McMahon Act were a necessary condition of a test ban, framing the policy shift in the context of US commitment to its NATO allies.

In August 1957, the US assented to a two-year testing moratorium proposed by the Soviet Union, but required that it be linked to restrictions on the production of fissionable material with military uses, a condition that the Soviet Union rejected. While Eisenhower insisted on linking a test ban to a broader disarmament effort (e.g., the production cut-off), Moscow insisted on independent consideration of a test ban.

On 19 September 1957, the US conducted the first contained underground test at the Nevada Test Site, codenamed Rainier. The Rainier shot complicated the push for a comprehensive test ban, as underground tests could not be as easily identified as atmospheric tests.

Despite Eisenhower's interest in a deal, his administration was hamstrung by discord among US scientists, technicians, and politicians. At one point, Eisenhower complained that "statecraft was becoming a prisoner of scientists." Until 1957, Strauss's AEC (including its Los Alamos and Livermore laboratories) was the dominant voice in the administration on nuclear affairs, with Teller's concerns over detection mechanisms also influencing Eisenhower. Unlike some others within the US scientific community, Strauss fervently advocated against a test ban, arguing that the US must maintain a clear nuclear advantage via regular testing and that the negative environmental impacts of such tests were overstated. Furthermore, Strauss repeatedly emphasized the risk of the Soviet Union violating a ban, a fear Eisenhower shared.

On 7 November 1957, after Sputnik and under pressure to bring on a dedicated science advisor, Eisenhower created the President's Science Advisory Committee (PSAC), which had the effect of eroding the AEC's monopoly over scientific advice. In stark contrast to the AEC, PSAC promoted a test ban and argued against Strauss's claims concerning its strategic implications and technical feasibility. In late 1957, the Soviet Union made a second offer of a three-year moratorium without inspections, but lacking any consensus within his administration, Eisenhower rejected it. In early 1958, the discord within American circles, particularly among scientists, was made clear in hearings before the Senate Subcommittee on Nuclear Disarmament, chaired by Senator Hubert Humphrey. The hearings featured conflicting testimony from the likes of Teller and Linus Pauling, as well as from Harold Stassen, who argued that a test ban could safely be separated from broader disarmament, and AEC members, who argued that a cutoff in nuclear production should precede a test ban.

==== Khrushchev and a moratorium: 1958–1961 ====
In the summer of 1957, Khrushchev was at acute risk of losing power, as the Anti-Party Group composed of former Stalin allies Lazar Kaganovich, Georgy Malenkov, and Vyacheslav Molotov launched an attempt to replace Khrushchev as General Secretary of the Communist Party (effectively the leader of the Soviet Union) with Nikolai Bulganin, then the Premier of the Soviet Union. The attempted ouster, which was foiled in June, was followed by a series of actions by Khrushchev to consolidate power. In October 1957, still feeling vulnerable from Anti-Party Group's ploy, Khrushchev forced out defense minister Georgy Zhukov, cited as "the nation's most powerful military man." On 27 March 1958, Khrushchev forced Bulganin to resign and succeeded him as Premier. Between 1957 and 1960, Khrushchev had his firmest grip on power, with little real opposition.

Khrushchev was personally troubled by the power of nuclear weapons and would later recount that he believed the weapons could never be used. In the mid-1950s, Khrushchev took a keen interest in defense policy and sought to inaugurate an era of détente with the West. Initial efforts to reach accords, such as on disarmament at the 1955 Geneva Summit, proved fruitless, and Khrushchev saw test-ban negotiations as an opportunity to present the Soviet Union as "both powerful and responsible." At the 20th Communist Party Congress in 1956, Khrushchev declared that nuclear war should no longer be seen as "fatalistically inevitable." Simultaneously, however, Khrushchev expanded and advanced the Soviet nuclear arsenal at a cost to conventional Soviet forces (e.g., in early 1960, Khrushchev announced demobilization of 1.2 million troops).

On 31 March 1958, the Supreme Soviet of the Soviet Union approved a decision to halt nuclear testing, conditional on other nuclear powers doing the same. Khrushchev then called on Eisenhower and Macmillan to join the moratorium. Despite the action being met with widespread praise and an argument from Dulles that the US should reciprocate, Eisenhower dismissed the plan as a "gimmick"; the Soviet Union had just completed a testing series and the US was about to begin Operation Hardtack I, a series of atmospheric, surface-level, and underwater nuclear tests. Eisenhower instead insisted that any moratorium be linked to reduced production of nuclear weapons. In April 1958, the US began Operation Hardtack I as planned. The Soviet declaration concerned the British government, which feared that the moratorium might lead to a test ban before its own testing program was completed. Following the Soviet declaration, Eisenhower called for an international meeting of experts to determine proper control and verification measures—an idea first proposed by British Foreign Secretary Selwyn Lloyd.

The advocacy of PSAC, including that of its chairmen James Rhyne Killian and George Kistiakowsky, was a key factor in Eisenhower's eventual decision to initiate test-ban negotiations in 1958. In the spring of 1958, chairman Killian and the PSAC staff (namely Hans Bethe and Isidor Isaac Rabi) undertook a review of US test-ban policy, determining that a successful system for detecting underground tests could be created. At the recommendation of Dulles (who had recently come to support a test ban), the review prompted Eisenhower to propose technical negotiations with the Soviet Union, effectively detaching test-ban negotiations from negotiations over a halt to nuclear weapons production (the one-time US demand). In explaining the policy shift, Eisenhower privately said that continued resistance to a test ban would leave the US in a state of "moral isolation."

On 8 April 1958, still resisting Khrushchev's call for a moratorium, Eisenhower invited the Soviet Union to join these technical negotiations in the form of a conference on the technical aspects of a test-ban, specifically the technical details of ensuring compliance with a ban. The proposal was, to a degree, a concession to the Soviet Union, as a test ban would be explored independent of the previously demanded cutoff in fissionable-material production. Khrushchev initially declined the invitation, but eventually agreed "in spite of the serious doubts" he had after Eisenhower suggested a technical agreement on verification would be a precursor to a test ban.

On 1 July 1958, responding to Eisenhower's call, the nuclear powers convened the Conference of Experts in Geneva, aimed at studying means of detecting nuclear tests. The conference included scientists from the US, Britain, the Soviet Union, Canada, Czechoslovakia, France, Poland, and Romania. The US delegation was led by James Fisk, a member of PSAC, the Soviets by Evgenii Fedorov, and the British delegation by William Penney, who had led the British delegation to the Manhattan Project. Whereas the US approached the conference solely from a technical perspective, Penney was specifically instructed by Macmillan to attempt to achieve a political agreement. This difference in approach was reflected in the broader composition of the US and UK teams. US experts were primarily drawn from academia and industry. Fisk was a vice president at Bell Telephone Laboratories and was joined by Robert Bacher and Ernest Lawrence, both physicists who had worked on the Manhattan Project. Conversely, British delegates largely held government positions. The Soviet delegation was composed primarily of academics, though virtually all of them had some link to the Soviet government. The Soviets shared the British goal of achieving an agreement at the conference.

At particular issue was the ability of sensors to differentiate an underground test from an earthquake. There were four techniques examined: measurement of acoustic waves, seismic signals, radio waves, and inspection of radioactive debris. The Soviet delegation expressed confidence in each method, while Western experts argued that a more comprehensive compliance system would be necessary.

The Conference of Experts was characterized as "highly professional" and productive. By the end of August 1958, the experts devised an extensive control program, known as the "Geneva System," involving 160–170 land-based monitoring posts, plus 10 additional sea-based monitors and occasional flights over land following a suspicious event (with the inspection plane being provided and controlled by the state under inspection). The experts determined that such a scheme would be able to detect 90% of underground detonations, accurate to 5 kilotons, and atmospheric tests with a minimum yield of 1 kiloton. The US had initially advocated for 650 posts, versus a Soviet proposal of 100–110. The final recommendation was a compromise forged by the British delegation. In a widely publicized and well-received communiqué dated 21 August 1958, the conference declared that it "reached the conclusion that it is technically feasible to set up ... a workable and effective control system for the detection of violations of a possible agreement on the worldwide cessation of nuclear weapons tests."

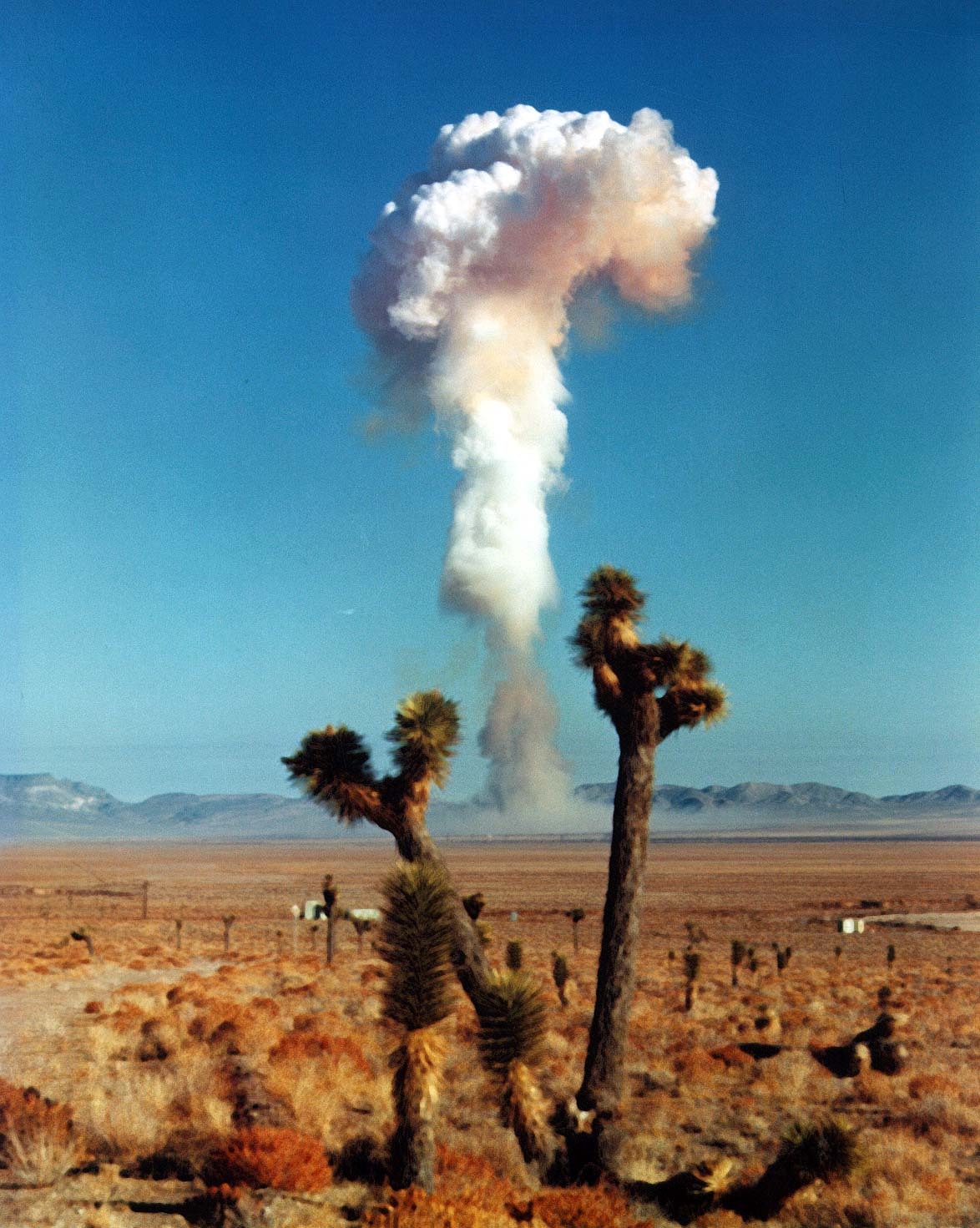
US test detonation (part of Operation Hardtack II) conducted shortly before the start of the moratorium in 1958

The technical findings, released on 30 August 1958 in a report drafted by the Soviet delegation, were endorsed by the US and UK, which proposed that they serve as the basis for test-ban and international-control negotiations. However, the experts' report failed to address precisely who would do the monitoring and when on-site inspections—a US demand and Soviet concern—would be permitted. The experts also deemed detection of outer-space tests (tests more than 50 kilometers (31 mi) above the earth's surface) to be impractical. Additionally, the size of the Geneva System may have rendered it too expensive to be put into effect. The 30 August report, which contained details on these limitations, received significantly less public attention than the 21 August communiqué.

Nevertheless, pleased by the findings, the Eisenhower administration proposed negotiations on a permanent test ban and announced it would self-impose a year-long testing moratorium if Britain and the Soviet Union did the same. This decision amounted to a victory for John Foster Dulles, Allen Dulles (then the Director of Central Intelligence), and PSAC, who had argued within the Eisenhower administration for separating a test ban from larger disarmament efforts, and a defeat for the Department of Defense and AEC, which had argued to the contrary.

In May 1958, Britain had informed the US that it would be willing to join a testing moratorium on 31 October 1958, by which point it would have finished its hydrogen-bomb testing, conditional on the US providing Britain with nuclear information following amendment of the McMahon Act. The US Congress approved amendments permitting greater collaboration in late June. Following Soviet assent on 30 August 1958 to the one-year moratorium, the three countries conducted a series of tests in September and October. At least 54 tests were conducted by the US and 14 by the Soviet Union in this period. On 31 October 1958 the three countries initiated test-ban negotiations (the Conference on the Discontinuance of Nuclear Tests) and agreed to a temporary moratorium (the Soviet Union joined the moratorium shortly after this date). The moratorium would last for close to three years.

The Conference on the Discontinuance of Nuclear Tests convened in Geneva at Moscow's request (the Western participants had proposed New York City). The US delegation was led by James Jeremiah Wadsworth, an envoy to the UN, the British by David Ormsby-Gore, the Minister of State for Foreign Affairs, and the Soviets by Semyon K. Tsarapkin, a disarmament expert with experience dating back to the 1946 Baruch Plan. The Geneva Conference began with a Soviet draft treaty grounded in the Geneva System. The three nuclear weapons states (the "original parties") would abide by a test ban, verified by the Geneva System, and work to prevent testing by potential nuclear states (such as France). This was rejected by Anglo-American negotiators due to fears that the verification provisions were too vague and the Geneva System too weak.

Shortly after the Geneva Conference began in the fall of 1958, Eisenhower faced renewed domestic opposition to a comprehensive test ban as Senator Albert Gore Sr. argued in a widely circulated letter that a partial ban would be preferable due to Soviet opposition to strong verification measures.

The Gore letter did spur some progress in negotiations, as the Soviet Union allowed in late November 1958 for explicit control measures to be included in the text of the drafted treaty. By March 1959, the negotiators had agreed upon seven treaty articles, but they primarily concerned uncontroversial issues and a number of disputes over verification persisted. First, the Soviet verification proposal was deemed by the West to be too reliant on self-inspection, with control posts primarily staffed by citizens of the country housing the posts and a minimal role for officials from the international supervisory body. The West insisted that half of a control post staff be drawn from another nuclear state and half from neutral parties. Second, the Soviet Union required that the international supervisory body, the Control Commission, require unanimity before acting; the West rejected the idea of giving Moscow a veto over the commission's proceedings. Finally, the Soviet Union preferred temporary inspection teams drawn from citizens of the country under inspection, while the West insisted on permanent teams composed of inspectors from the Control Commission.

Additionally, despite the initial positive response to the Geneva experts' report, data gathered from Hardtack operations of 1958 (namely the underground Rainier shot) would further complicate verification provisions as US scientists, including Hans Bethe (who backed a ban), became convinced that the Geneva findings were too optimistic regarding detection of underground tests, though Macmillan warned that using the data to block progress on a test ban might be perceived in the public as a political ploy. In early 1959, Wadsworth told Tsarapkin of new US skepticism towards the Geneva System. While the Geneva experts believed the system could detect underground tests down to five kilotons, the US now believed that it could only detect tests down to 20 kilotons (in comparison, the Little Boy bomb dropped on Hiroshima had an official yield of 13 kilotons). As a result, the Geneva detection regime and the number of control posts would have to be significantly expanded, including new posts within the Soviet Union. The Soviets dismissed the US argument as a ruse, suggesting that the Hardtack data had been falsified.

In early 1959, a roadblock to an agreement was removed as Macmillan and Eisenhower, over opposition from the Department of Defense, agreed to consider a test ban separately from broader disarmament endeavors.

On 13 April 1959, facing Soviet opposition to on-site detection systems for underground tests, Eisenhower proposed moving from a single, comprehensive test ban to a graduated agreement where atmospheric tests—those up to 50 km (31 mi) high, a limit Eisenhower would revise upward in May 1959—would be banned first, with negotiations on underground and outer-space tests continuing. This proposal was turned down on 23 April 1959 by Khrushchev, calling it a "dishonest deal." On 26 August 1959, the US announced it would extend its year-long testing moratorium to the end of 1959, and would not conduct tests after that point without prior warning. The Soviet Union reaffirmed that it would not conduct tests if the US and UK continued to observe a moratorium.

To break the deadlock over verification, Macmillan proposed a compromise in February 1959 whereby each of the original parties would be subject to a set number of on-site inspections each year. In May 1959, Khrushchev and Eisenhower agreed to explore Macmillan's quota proposal, though Eisenhower made further test-ban negotiations conditional on the Soviet Union dropping its Control Commission veto demand and participating in technical discussions on identification of high-altitude nuclear explosions. Khrushchev agreed to the latter and was noncommittal on the former. A working group in Geneva would eventually devise a costly system of 5–6 satellites orbiting at least 18,000 miles (29,000 km) above the earth, though it could not say with certainty that such a system would be able to determine the origin of a high-altitude test. US negotiators also questioned whether high-altitude tests could evade detection via radiation shielding. Concerning Macmillan's compromise, the Soviet Union privately suggested it would accept a quota of three inspections per year. The US argued that the quota should be set according to scientific necessity (i.e., be set according to the frequency of seismic events).

In June 1959, a report of a panel headed by Lloyd Berkner, a physicist, was introduced into discussions by Wadsworth. The report specifically concerned whether the Geneva System could be improved without increasing the number of control posts. Berkner's proposed measures were seen as highly costly and the technical findings themselves were accompanied by a caveat about the panel's high degree of uncertainty given limited data. Around the same time, analysis conducted by the Livermore National Laboratory and RAND Corporation at Teller's instruction found that the seismic effect of an underground test could be artificially dampened (referred to as "decoupling") to the point that a 300-kiloton detonation would appear in seismic readings as a one-kiloton detonation. These findings were largely affirmed by pro-ban scientists, including Bethe. The third blow to the verification negotiations was provided by a panel chaired by Robert Bacher, which found that even on-site inspections would have serious difficulty determining whether an underground test had been conducted.

In September 1959, Khrushchev visited the US. While the test ban was not a focus of conversations, a positive meeting with Eisenhower at Camp David eventually led Tsarapkin to propose a technical working group in November 1959 that would consider the issues of on-site inspections and seismic decoupling in the "spirit of Camp David." Within the working group, Soviet delegates allowed for the timing of on-site inspections to be grounded in seismic data, but insisted on conditions that were seen as excessively strict. The Soviets also recognized the theory behind decoupling, but dismissed its practical applications. The working group closed in December with no progress and significant hostility. Eisenhower issued a statement blaming "the recent unwillingness of the politically guided Soviet experts to give serious scientific consideration to the effectiveness of seismic techniques for the detection of underground nuclear explosions." Eisenhower simultaneously declared that the US would not be held to its testing moratorium when it expired on 31 December 1959, though pledged to not test if Geneva talks progressed. The Soviet Union followed by reiterating its decision to not test as long as Western states did not test.

In early 1960, Eisenhower indicated his support for a comprehensive test ban conditional on proper monitoring of underground tests. On 11 February 1960, Wadsworth announced a new US proposal by which only tests deemed verifiable by the Geneva System would be banned, including all atmospheric, underwater, and outer-space tests within detection range. Underground tests measuring more than 4.75 on the Richter scale would also be barred, subject to revision as research on detection continued. Adopting Macmillan's quota compromise, the US proposed each nuclear state be subject to roughly 20 on-site inspections per year (the precise figure based on the frequency of seismic events).

Tsarapkin responded positively to the US proposal, though was wary of the prospect of allowing underground tests registering below magnitude 4.75. In its own proposal offered 19 March 1960 the Soviet Union accepted most US provisions, with certain amendments. First, the Soviet Union asked that underground tests under magnitude 4.75 be banned for a period of four-to-five years, subject to extension. Second, it sought to prohibit all outer-space tests, whether within detection range or not. Finally, the Soviet Union insisted that the inspection quota be determined on a political basis, not a scientific one. The Soviet offer faced a mixed reception. In the US, Senator Hubert Humphrey and the Federation of American Scientists (which was typically seen as supportive of a test ban) saw it as a clear step towards an agreement. Conversely, AEC chairman John A. McCone and Senator Clinton Presba Anderson, chair of the Joint Committee on Atomic Energy, argued that the Soviet system would be unable to prevent secret tests. That year, the AEC published a report arguing that the continuing testing moratorium risked "free world supremacy in nuclear weapons," and that renewed testing was critical for further weapons development. The joint committee also held hearings in April which cast doubt on the technical feasibility and cost of the proposed verification measures. Additionally, Teller continued to warn of the dangerous consequences of a test ban and the Department of Defense (including Neil H. McElroy and Donald A. Quarles, until recently its top two officials) pushed to continue testing and expand missile stockpiles.

Shortly after the Soviet proposal, Macmillan met with Eisenhower at Camp David to devise a response. The Anglo-American counterproposal agreed to ban small underground tests (those under magnitude 4.75) on a temporary basis (a duration of roughly 1 year, versus the Soviet proposal of 4–5 years), but this could only happen after verifiable tests had been banned and a seismic research group (the Seismic Research Program Advisory Group) convened. The Soviet Union responded positively to the counterproposal and the research group convened on 11 May 1960. The Soviet Union also offered to keep an underground ban out of the treaty under negotiation. In May 1960, there were high hopes that an agreement would be reached at an upcoming summit of Eisenhower, Khrushchev, Macmillan, and Charles de Gaulle of France in Paris.

A test ban seemed particularly close in 1960, with Britain and France in accord with the US (though France conducted its first nuclear test in February) and the Soviet Union having largely accepted the Macmillan–Eisenhower proposal. But US-Soviet relations soured after an American U-2 spy plane was shot down in Soviet airspace in May 1960. The Paris summit was abruptly cancelled and the Soviet Union withdrew from the seismic research group, which subsequently dissolved. Meetings of the Geneva Conference continued until December, but little progress was made as Western-Soviet relations continued to grow more antagonistic through the summer, punctuated by the Congo Crisis in July and angry exchanges at the UN in September. Macmillan would later claim to President John F. Kennedy that the failure to achieve a test ban in 1960 "was all the fault of the American 'big hole' obsession and the consequent insistence on a wantonly large number of on-site inspections."

Eisenhower would leave office with an agreement out of reach, as Eisenhower's technical advisors, upon whom he relied heavily, became mired in the complex technical questions of a test ban, driven in part by a strong interest among American experts to lower the error rate of seismic test detection technology. Some, including Kistiakowsky, would eventually raise concerns about the ability of inspections and monitors to successfully detect tests. The primary product of negotiations under Eisenhower was the testing moratorium without any enforcement mechanism. Ultimately, the goal of a comprehensive test ban would be abandoned in favor of a partial ban due to questions over seismic detection of underground tests.

Political scientist Robert Gilpin later argued that Eisenhower faced three camps in the push for a test ban. The first was the "control" camp, led by figures like Linus Pauling and astronomer Harlow Shapley, which believed that both testing and possession of nuclear weapons was dangerous. Second, there was the "finite containment" camp, populated by scientists like Hans Bethe, which was concerned by perceived Soviet aggression but still believed that a test ban would be workable with adequate verification measures. Third, the "infinite containment" camp, of which Strauss, Teller, and members of the defense establishment were members, believed that any test ban would grant the Soviet Union the ability to conduct secret tests and move ahead in the arms race.

The degree of Eisenhower's interest in a test ban is a matter of some historical dispute. Stephen E. Ambrose writes that by early 1960, a test ban had become "the major goal of his Presidency, indeed of his entire career," and would be "his final and most lasting gift to his country." Conversely, John Lewis Gaddis characterizes negotiations of the 1950s as "an embarrassing series of American reversals," suggesting a lack of real US commitment to arms control efforts. The historian Robert Divine also attributed the failure to achieve a deal to Eisenhower's "lack of leadership," evidenced by his inability to overcome paralyzing differences among US diplomats, military leaders, national security experts, and scientists on the subject. Paul Nitze would similarly suggest that Eisenhower never formulated a cohesive test ban policy, noting his ability to "believe in two mutually contradictory and inconsistent propositions at the same time."

=== Renewed efforts ===
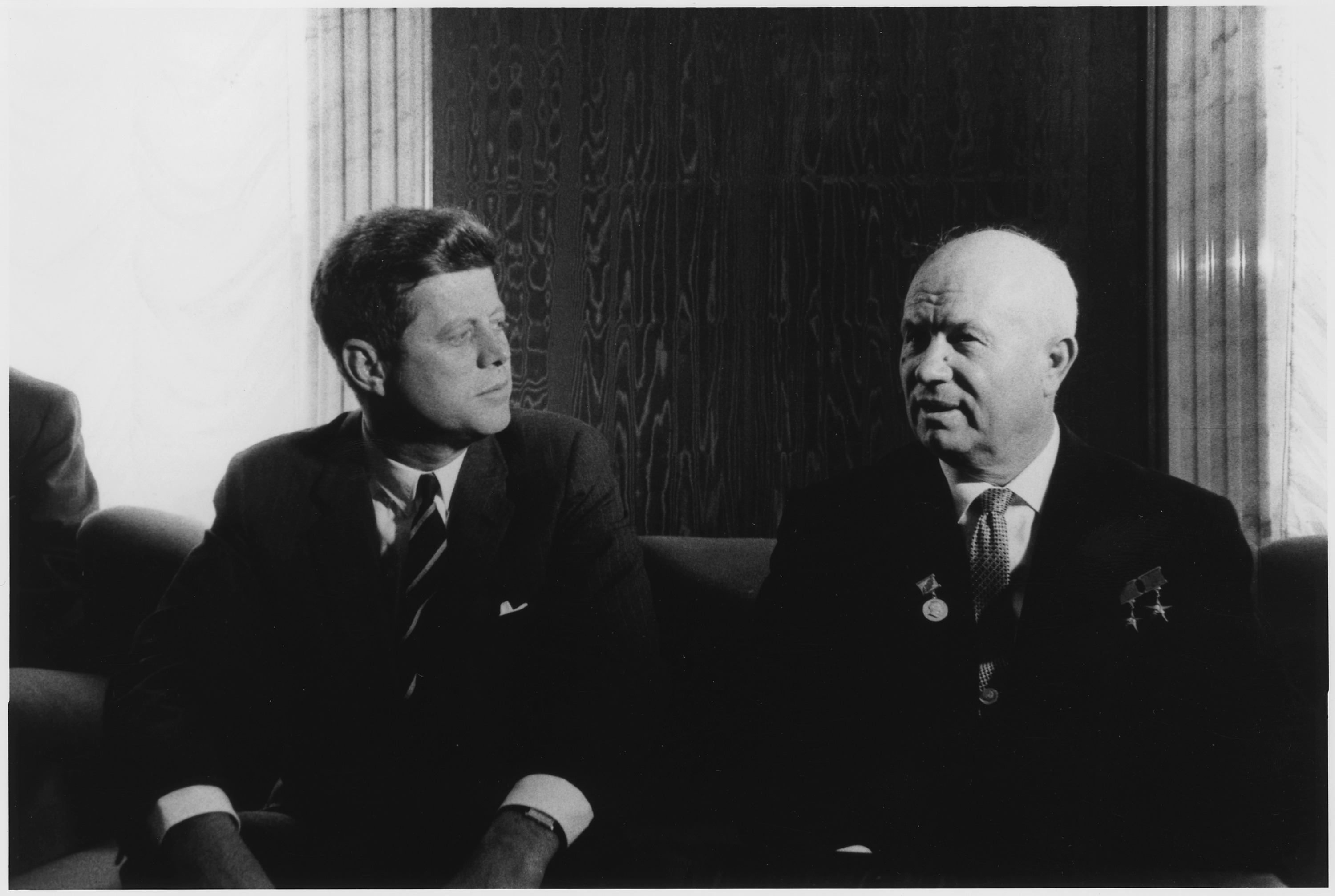
Kennedy and Khrushchev in Vienna

Upon assuming the presidency in January 1961, John F. Kennedy was committed to advancing a comprehensive test ban on nuclear weapons. He quickly ordered a review of the U.S. negotiating position to revitalize stalled talks, as he believed Eisenhower's previous approach had been "insufficient" in achieving meaningful progress toward nuclear disarmament. Kennedy saw the test ban as a critical step toward reducing nuclear proliferation and easing Cold War tensions. In making his case for a test ban, Kennedy drew a direct link between continued testing and nuclear proliferation, calling it the "'Nth-country' problem." While a candidate, Kennedy had argued, "For once China, or France, or Sweden, or half a dozen other nations successfully test an atomic bomb, the security of both Russians and Americans is dangerously weakened." He had also claimed that renewed testing would be "damaging to the American image" and might threaten the "existence of human life." On the campaign trail, Kennedy's test-ban proposal consisted of a continued US testing moratorium, expanded efforts to reach a comprehensive agreement, limit any future tests to those minimizing fallout, and expand research on fallout. Notably, early in his presidency, Kennedy also oversaw a significant increase in U.S. defense spending, a move that was soon mirrored by the Soviet Union. This escalation intensified the arms race and placed the test-ban negotiations within a broader context of heightened military competition. Despite these growing tensions, Kennedy remained committed to pursuing a comprehensive test ban, recognizing it as a crucial step toward curbing the nuclear arms race.

On 21 March 1961, test-ban negotiations resumed in Geneva and Arthur Dean, a lead US envoy, offered a new proposal in an attempt to bridge the gap between the two sides. The early Kennedy proposal largely grew out of later Eisenhower efforts, with a ban on all tests but low-yield underground ones (below magnitude 4.75), which would be subject to a three-year moratorium. The US and UK proposed 20 on-site inspections per annum, while the Soviet Union proposed three. The verification procedures included in the Anglo-American plan were unacceptable to Tsarapkin, who responded with separate proposals rejected by the Western powers. Specifically, the Soviet Union proposed a "troika" mechanism: a monitoring board composed of representatives of the West, the Soviet Union, and nonaligned states that would require unanimity before acting (effectively giving the Soviet Union veto authority). In May 1961, Kennedy attempted via secret contact between Attorney General Robert F. Kennedy and a Soviet intelligence officer to settle on 15 inspections per year. This was rejected by Khrushchev.

Ahead of the June 1961 Vienna summit between Kennedy and Khrushchev, Robert F. Kennedy spoke with the Soviet ambassador to the US, who suggested that progress on a test ban was possible in a direct meeting between the leaders. President Kennedy subsequently announced to the press that he had "strong hopes" for progress on a test ban. In Vienna, Khrushchev suggested that three inspections per year would have to be the limit, as anything more frequent would constitute espionage. Khrushchev privately believed allowing three inspections to be a significant concession to the West, as other Soviet officials preferred an even less intrusive system, and was angered by US resistance. Khrushchev later told his son, "hold out a finger to them—they chop off your whole hand."

Additionally, the Soviet Union had once been ready to support a control commission under the aegis of the UN, Khrushchev explained, but it could no longer do so given perceived bias in recent UN action in the Congo. Instead, Khrushchev reiterated the troika proposal. Furthermore, Khrushchev insisted that the test ban be considered in the context of "general and complete disarmament," arguing that a test ban on its own was unimportant; Kennedy said the US could only agree with a guarantee that a disarmament agreement would be reached quickly (the Vienna demands thus amounted to a reversal of both sides' earlier positions). Kennedy also disagreed that a test ban was itself insignificant; the world could expect many more countries in the coming years to cross the nuclear threshold without a test ban. Ultimately, the two leaders left Vienna without clear progress on the subject. The Soviet Union would drop the general-disarmament demand in November 1961.

==== Lifting the moratorium: 1961–1962 ====
Following setbacks at the Vienna Summit and the escalation of the Berlin Crisis of 1961, as well as the Soviet Union's decision to resume nuclear testing in August attributed by Moscow to a shifting international situation and France's nuclear tests, Kennedy faced increasing pressure from the Department of Defense and nuclear laboratories to abandon hopes of a test ban. In June 1961, after talks in Geneva had stalled, Kennedy voiced concerns that Soviet negotiating behavior posed "a serious question about how long we can safely continue on a voluntary basis a refusal to undertake tests in this country without any assurance that the Russians are not testing." Whether the Soviets had actually conducted secret tests remained a point of debate within the Kennedy administration.

A team led by physicist Wolfgang K. H. Panofsky investigated the possibility that the Soviet Union had secretly tested nuclear weapons, concluding that while such tests were possible, no evidence suggested they had occurred. Despite these findings, the Joint Chiefs of Staff dismissed Panofsky's report as "assertive, ambiguous, semiliterate, and generally unimpressive," reflecting the deep skepticism and tension within the U.S. government over Soviet activities and the broader test-ban negotiations. "

Two weeks after the lifting of the Soviet moratorium in August 1961, and after another failed Anglo-American attempt to have the Soviet Union agree to an atmospheric-test ban, the US restarted testing on 15 September 1961. Kennedy specifically limited such testing to underground and laboratory tests, but under mounting pressure as Soviet tests continued—during the time period of the Soviet Tsar Bomba 50 Mt+ test detonation on 30 October over Novaya Zemlya—Kennedy announced and dedicated funds to a renewed atmospheric testing program in November 1961.

A report on the 1961 Soviet test, published by a group of American scientists led by Hans Bethe, concluded that Soviet laboratories had likely been operating at full capacity throughout the moratorium, anticipating a resumption of testing. The report suggested that preparations for testing probably began even before the talks resumed in Geneva in March 1961. By January 1962, Bethe, who had previously supported a test ban, publicly declared that a ban was "no longer a desirable goal" and advocated for the United States to conduct tests on weapons developed by its laboratories. In contrast, U.S. laboratories had been relatively inactive regarding nuclear weapons during the moratorium, highlighting a significant disparity in activity between the two nations.

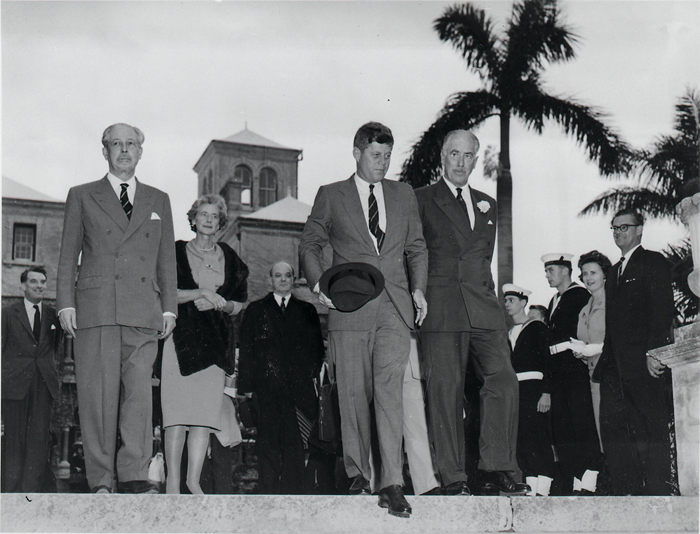
Macmillan and Kennedy in Bermuda

In December 1961, Macmillan met with Kennedy in Bermuda, appealing for a final and permanent halt to tests. Kennedy, conversely, used the meeting to request permission to test on Christmas Island, with US testing grounds in the Pacific having largely been exhausted. Macmillan agreed to seek to give US permission "if the situation did not change." Christmas Island was ultimately opened to US use by February 1962.

On this matter of resumed atmospheric tests, Kennedy lacked the full backing of his administration and allies. In particularly, Macmillan, Adlai Stevenson (then the UN ambassador), the State Department, the United States Information Agency, and Jerome Wiesner, the PSAC chairman, opposed resuming atmospheric tests. On the side advocating resumption were the AEC, Joint Committee on Atomic Energy, Joint Chiefs of Staff (which had called for renewed atmospheric tests in October 1961), and Department of Defense, though then-Secretary of Defense Robert McNamara privately acknowledged that such tests were "not really necessary." Teller continued to advocate for atmospheric tests, as well, arguing in early 1962 that nuclear fallout was nothing be concerned about. Teller also argued that testing was necessary to continued advancement of US nuclear capabilities, particularly in terms of the mobility of its weapons and, accordingly, its second-strike capability.

Despite Teller's reassurances, Kennedy himself "hated the idea of reopening the race" and was uneasy with continued production of fallout, a negative consequence of resumed testing that its opponents within the administration stressed. Opponents of the tests also argued that renewed atmospheric tests would come at a significant moral cost to the US, given broad public opposition to the plan, and claimed that further tests were largely unnecessary, with the US already having an adequate nuclear arsenal. Arthur Dean believed that public opposition to atmospheric testing was so great that the US would have to halt such tests within four years even without an agreement. John Kenneth Galbraith, then the ambassador to India, had advised Kennedy in June 1961 that resumed testing "would cause us the gravest difficulties in Asia, Africa and elsewhere." Similarly, Hubert Humphrey described the moratorium as "a ray of hope to millions of worried people." Its termination, Humphrey warned, "might very well turn the political tides in the world in behalf of the Soviets."

Ultimately, Kennedy sided with those arguing for resumed testing. In particular, an argument by William C. Foster, the head of the Arms Control and Disarmament Agency, swayed Kennedy. Foster argued that if the US failed to respond to the Soviet test series, Moscow could order a second test series, which could give the Soviet Union a significant advantage. Furthermore, a second test series, without US reciprocation, could damage the push for a test ban and make Senate ratification of any agreement less likely. On 2 March 1962, building on the November 1961 announcement, Kennedy promised to resume atmospheric testing by the end of April 1962 if Moscow continued to resist the Anglo-American test-ban proposal. To an extent, the announcement was a compromise, as Kennedy restricted atmospheric tests to those tests which were "absolutely necessary," not feasible underground, and minimized fallout. The condition that testing would resume only if the Soviet Union continued to oppose the Anglo-American proposal also served as a concession to dissenting voices within his administration and to Macmillan.

Kennedy portrayed resumed testing as a necessary for the image of US resolve. If the US failed to respond to the Soviet test series, Kennedy explained, Moscow would "chalk it up, not to goodwill, but to a failure of will—not to our confidence in Western superiority, but to our fear of world opinion." Keeping the US in a position of strength, Kennedy argued, would be necessary for a test ban to ever come about.

The US suspension of atmospheric tests was lifted on 25 April 1962.

By March 1962, the trilateral talks in Geneva had shifted to 18-party talks at the UN Disarmament Conference. On 27 August 1962, within that conference, the US and UK offered two draft treaties to the Soviet Union. The primary proposal included a comprehensive ban verified by control posts under national command, but international supervision, and required on-site inspections. This was rejected by the Soviet Union due to the inspection requirement. The alternative proposal included a partial test ban—underground tests would be excluded—to be verified by national detection mechanisms, without supervision by a supranational body.

==== Cuban Missile Crisis and beyond: 1962–1963 ====
In October 1962, the U.S. and Soviet Union experienced the Cuban Missile Crisis, which brought the two superpowers to the brink of nuclear war. This intense standoff prompted both Kennedy and Khrushchev to seek accelerated rapprochement, recognizing the urgent need to reduce tensions and prevent future confrontations. After years of dormant or lethargic negotiations, American and British negotiators subsequently forged a strong working relationship and with Soviet negotiators found common ground on test restrictions later in 1962. After years of pursuing a comprehensive ban, Khrushchev was convinced to accept a partial ban, partly due to the efforts of Soviet nuclear scientists, including Kurchatov, Sakharov, and Yulii Khariton, who argued that atmospheric testing had severe consequences for human health. Khrushchev had been concerned by a partial ban due to the greater US experience in underground tests; by 1962, the US had conducted 89 such tests and the Soviet Union just two (the Soviet focus had been on cheaper, larger-yield atmospheric tests). For this reason, many in the Soviet weapons industry argued that a partial ban would give the US the advantage in nuclear capabilities. Khrushchev would later recount that he saw test-ban negotiations as a prime venue for ameliorating tensions after the crisis in Cuba.

Shocked by how close the world had come to thermonuclear war, Khrushchev proposed easing tensions with the U.S. In a letter to President Kennedy dated 30 October 1962, Khrushchev outlined a series of bold initiatives to prevent the possibility of nuclear war. His proposals included a non-aggression treaty between NATO and the Warsaw Pact, or even the disbanding of these military blocs; a treaty to cease all nuclear weapons testing; and the complete elimination of all nuclear weapons. He also suggested resolving the contentious issue of Germany by having both East and West formally recognize the existence of West Germany and East Germany, as well as calling for U.S. recognition of the government of mainland China.

The letter invited counter-proposals and encouraged further exploration of these and other issues through peaceful negotiations. Additionally, Khrushchev invited Norman Cousins, the editor of a major U.S. periodical and an anti-nuclear weapons activist, to serve as a liaison with President Kennedy. Cousins met with Khrushchev for four hours in December 1962. Cousins' secret mission was aided by Pope John XXIII, who served as an intermediary; officially, Cousins was traveling to Rome on a personal basis, but from the Vatican he continued to the Soviet Union. Through Cousins' shuttle diplomacy in 1962 and 1963, the pontiff remained at the center of negotiations and helped ease misunderstandings between the two world leaders.

Kennedy's response to Khrushchev's proposals was lukewarm but Kennedy expressed to Cousins that he felt constrained in exploring these issues due to pressure from hardliners in the US national security apparatus. However Kennedy pursued negotiations for a partial nuclear test ban.

On 13 November 1962, Tsarapkin indicated that the Soviet Union would accept a proposal drafted by US and Soviet experts involving automated test detection stations ("black boxes") and a limited number of on-site inspections. The two sides disagreed over the number of black boxes, however, as the US sought 12–20 such stations and the Soviet Union rejected any more than three. On 28 December 1962, Kennedy lowered the US demand to 8–10 stations. On 19 February 1963, the number was lowered further to seven, as Khrushchev continued to insist on no more than three. Kennedy was willing to reduce the number to six, though this was not clearly communicated to the Soviet Union. On 20 April 1963, Khrushchev withdrew support for three inspections entirely.

Progress was further complicated in early 1963, as a group in the US Congress called for the Soviet proposal to be discarded in favor of the Geneva System. On 27 May 1963, 34 US Senators, led by Humphrey and Thomas J. Dodd, introduced a resolution calling for Kennedy to propose another partial ban to the Soviet Union involving national monitoring and no on-site inspections. Absent Soviet agreement, the resolution called for Kennedy to continue to "pursue it with vigor, seeking the widest possible international support" while suspending all atmospheric and underwater tests. The effect of the resolution was to bolster the general push for a test ban, though Kennedy initially was concerned that it would damage attempts to secure a comprehensive ban, and had administration figures (including the Joint Chiefs of Staff) reiterate a call for a comprehensive ban. That same spring of 1963, however, Kennedy had sent antinuclear activist Norman Cousins to Moscow to meet with Khrushchev, where he explained that the political situation in the US made it very difficult for Kennedy agree to a comprehensive ban with Khrushchev's required terms. Cousins also assured Khrushchev that though Kennedy had rejected Khrushchev's offer of three yearly inspections, he still was set on achieving a test ban. In March 1963, Kennedy had also held a press conference in which he re-committed to negotiations with the Soviet Union as a means of preventing rapid nuclear proliferation, which he characterized as "the greatest possible danger and hazard."

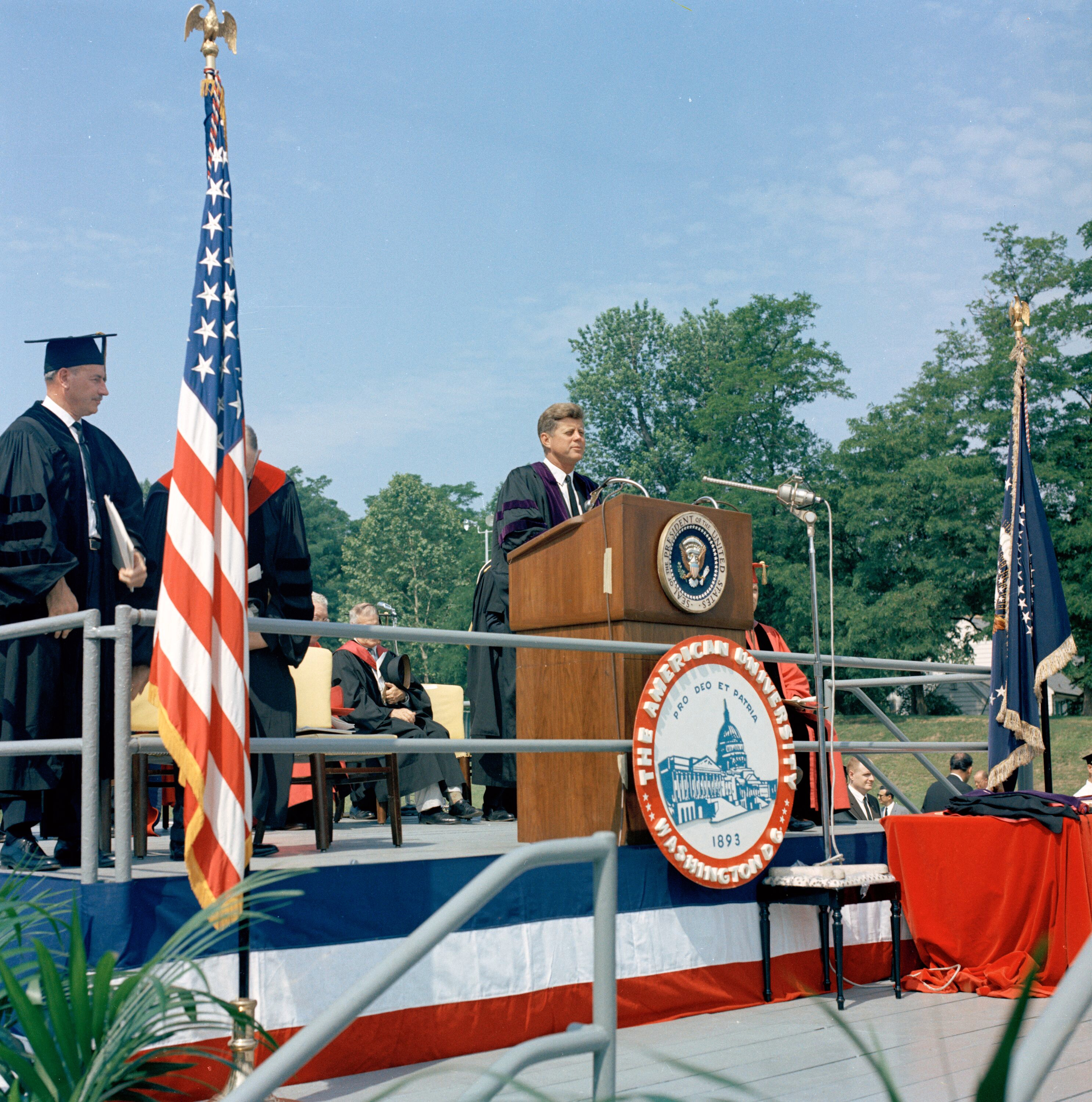
Kennedy at American University

One of Kennedy's advisors, Walt Whitman Rostow, advised the President to make a test ban conditional on the Soviet Union withdrawing troops from Cuba and abiding by a 1962 agreement on Laos, but Kennedy opted instead for test-ban negotiations without preconditions. On 10 June 1963, in an effort to reinvigorate and recontextualize a test ban, President Kennedy dedicated his commencement address at American University to "the most important topic on earth: world peace" and proceeded to make his case for the treaty. Kennedy first called on Americans to dispel the idea that peace is unattainable. "Let us focus instead on a more practical, more attainable peace," Kennedy said, "based not on a sudden revolution in human nature but on a gradual evolution in human institutions—on a series of concrete actions and effective agreements which are in the interest of all concerned." Second, Kennedy appealed for a new attitude towards the Soviet Union, calling Americans to not "see only a distorted and desperate view of the other side, not to see conflict as inevitable, accommodations as impossible and communication as nothing more than an exchange of threats." Finally, Kennedy argued for a reduction in Cold War tensions, with a test ban serving as a first step towards complete disarmament:

... where a fresh start is badly needed—is in a treaty to outlaw nuclear tests. The conclusion of such a treaty—so near and yet so far—would check the spiraling arms race in one of its most dangerous areas. It would place the nuclear powers in a position to deal more effectively with one of the greatest hazards which man faces in 1963, the further spread of nuclear arms. It would increase our security—it would decrease the prospects of war. Surely this goal is sufficiently important to require our steady pursuit, yielding neither to the temptation to give up the whole effort nor the temptation to give up our insistence on vital and responsible safeguards.

Kennedy proceeded to announce an agreement with Khrushchev and Macmillan to promptly resume comprehensive test-ban negotiations in Moscow and a US decision to unilaterally halt atmospheric tests. The speech was well received by Khrushchev, who later called it "the greatest speech by any American President since Roosevelt," though was met with some skepticism within the US. The speech was endorsed by Humphrey and other Democrats, but labeled a "dreadful mistake" by Republican Senator Barry Goldwater and "another case of concession" by Everett Dirksen, the leader of the Senate Republicans. Dirksen and Charles A. Halleck, the second-ranking House Republican, warned that the renewed negotiations might end in "virtual surrender."

Due to prior experience in arms control and his personal relationship with Khrushchev, former Assistant Secretary of War John J. McCloy was first considered the likely choice for chief US negotiator in Moscow, but his name was withdrawn after he turned out to be unavailable over the summer. W. Averell Harriman, a former ambassador to the Soviet Union well respected in Moscow, was chosen instead. The US delegation would also include Adrian S. Fisher, Carl Kaysen, John McNaughton, and William R. Tyler. In Britain, Macmillan initially wanted David Ormsby-Gore, who had just completed a term as foreign minister, to lead his delegation, but there were concerns that Ormsby-Gore would appear to be a US "stooge" (Kennedy described him as "the brightest man he ever knew"). Instead, Macmillan chose Quintin Hogg. Arthur M. Schlesinger Jr., a special advisor to Kennedy, believed that Hogg was "ill prepared on the technicalities of the problem and was consumed by a desire to get a treaty at almost any cost." Andrei Gromyko, the Soviet Minister of Foreign Affairs, served as Moscow's emissary.

Heading into the negotiations, there was still no resolution within the Kennedy Administration of the question of whether to pursue a comprehensive or partial ban. In an effort to achieve the former, Britain proposed reducing the number of mandated inspections to allay Soviet concerns, but Harriman believed such a reduction would have to be paired with other concessions that Khrushchev would be able to show off within the Soviet Union and to China. Withdrawing PGM-19 Jupiter missiles from Italy and Turkey would have been an option, had they not already been removed in the wake of the Cuban Missile Crisis. In meetings prior to the negotiations, Kennedy informed Harriman that he would be willing to make concessions on the Berlin question.

On 2 July 1963, Khrushchev proposed a partial ban on tests in the atmosphere, outer space, and underwater, which would avoid the contentious issue of detecting underground tests. Notably, Khrushchev did not link this proposal to a moratorium on underground tests (as had been proposed earlier), but said it should be followed by a non-aggression pact between NATO and the Warsaw Pact. "A test ban agreement combined with the signing of a non-aggression pact between the two groups of state will create a fresh international climate more favorable for a solution of the major problems of our time, including disarmament," Khrushchev said.

As the nuclear powers pursued a test ban agreement, they also sought to contend with a rising communist China, which at the time was pursuing its own nuclear program. In 1955, Mao Zedong expressed to the Soviet Union his belief that China could withstand a first nuclear strike and more than 100 million casualties. In the 1950s, the Soviet Union assisted the Chinese nuclear program, but stopped short of providing China with an actual nuclear bomb, which was followed by increasingly tense relations in the late 1950s and early 1960s. Khrushchev began the test-ban talks of 1958 with minimal prior discussion with China, and the two countries' agreement on military-technology cooperation was terminated in June 1959. Prior to the Moscow negotiations of the summer of 1963, Kennedy granted Harriman significant latitude in reaching a "Soviet-American understanding" vis-à-vis China. Secret Sino-Soviet talks in July 1963 revealed further discord between the two communist powers, as the Soviet Union released a statement that it did not "share the views of the Chinese leadership about creating 'a thousand times higher civilization' on the corpses of hundreds of millions of people." The Soviet Union also issued an ideological critique of China's nuclear policy, declaring that China's apparent openness to nuclear war was "in crying contradiction to the idea of Marxism–Leninism," as a nuclear war would "not distinguish between imperialists and working people."

The negotiations were inaugurated on 15 July 1963 at the Kremlin with Khrushchev in attendance. Khrushchev reiterated that the Anglo-American inspection plan would amount to espionage, effectively dismissing the possibility of a comprehensive ban. Following the script of his 3 July 1963 speech, Khrushchev did not demand a simultaneous moratorium on underground testing and instead proposed a non-aggression pact. Under instruction from Washington, Harriman replied that the US would explore the possibility of a non-aggression pact in good faith, but indicated that while a test ban could be quickly completed, a non-aggression pact would require lengthy discussions. Additionally, such a pact would complicate the issue of Western access to West Berlin. Harriman also took the opportunity to propose a non-proliferation agreement with would bar the transfer of nuclear weapons between countries. Khrushchev said that such an agreement should be considered in the future, but in the interim, a test ban would have the same effect on limiting proliferation.

Following initial discussions, Gromyko and Harriman began examining drafts of a test-ban agreement. First, language in the drafted preamble appeared to Harriman to prohibit the use of nuclear weapons in self-defense, which Harriman insisted be clarified. Harriman additionally demanded that an explicit clause concerning withdrawal from the agreement be added to the treaty; Khrushchev believed that each state had a sovereign right to withdraw, which should simply be assumed. Harriman informed Gromyko that without a clause governing withdrawal, which he believed the US Senate would demand, the US could not assent. Ultimately, the two sides settled upon compromise language:

Each Party shall in exercising its national sovereignty have the right to withdraw from the Treaty if it decides that extraordinary events, related to the subject matter of this Treaty, have jeopardized the supreme interests of its country.

Gromyko and Harriman debated how states not universally recognized (e.g., East Germany and China) could join the agreement. The US proposed asserting that accession to the treaty would not indicate international recognition. This was rejected by the Soviet Union. Eventually, with Kennedy's approval, US envoys Fisher and McNaughton devised a system whereby multiple government would serve as depositaries for the treaty, allowing individual states to sign only the agreement held by the government of their choice in association with other like-minded states. This solution, which overcame one of the more challenging roadblocks in the negotiations, also served to allay mounting concerns from Macmillan, which were relayed to Washington, that an agreement would once again be derailed. Finally, in an original Soviet draft, the signature of France would have been required for the treaty to come into effect. At Harriman's insistence, this requirement was removed.

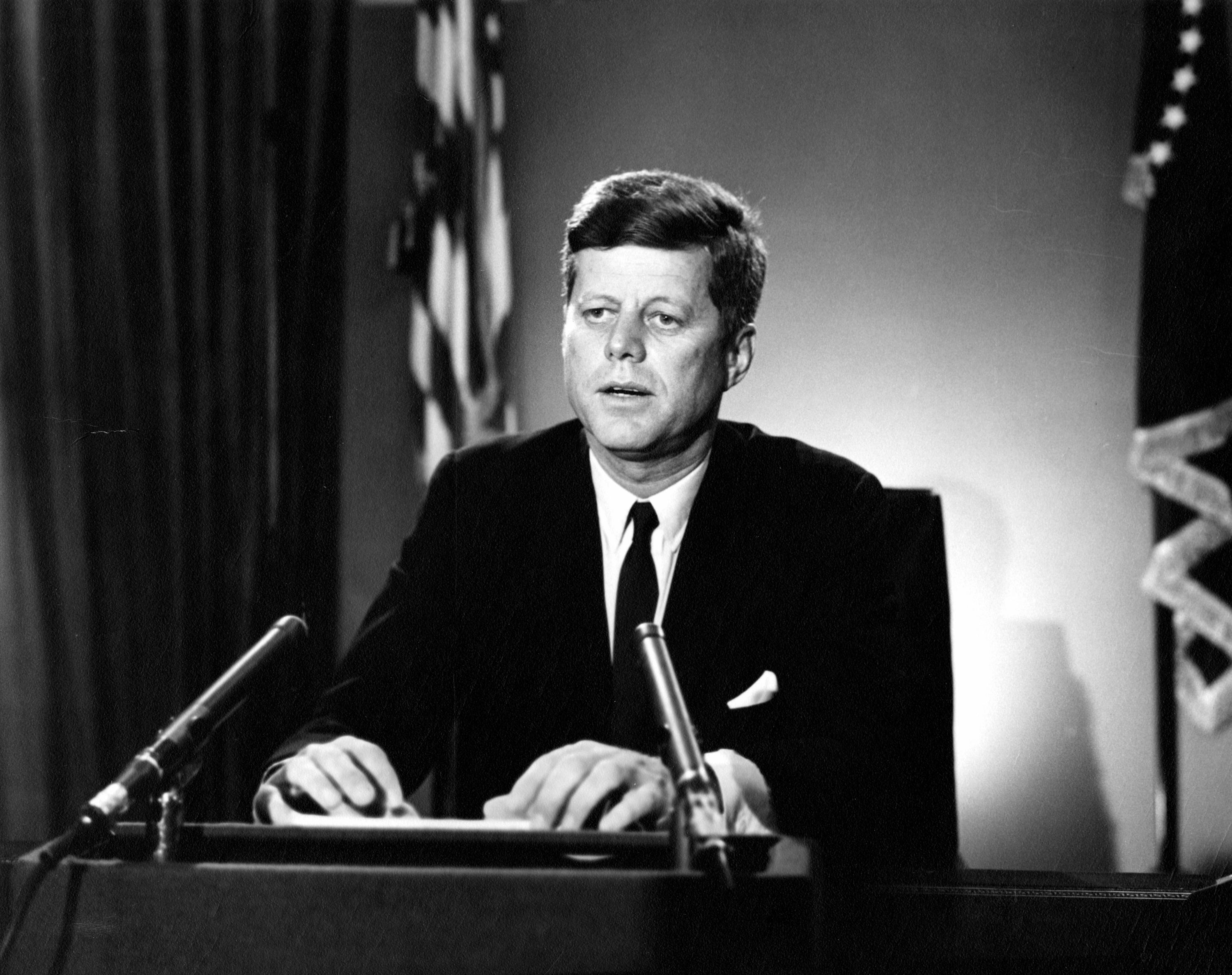
Kennedy announces the agreement on 26 July 1963

The agreement was initialed on 25 July 1963, just 10 days after negotiations commenced. The following day, Kennedy delivered a 26-minute televised address on the agreement, declaring that since the invention of nuclear weapons, "all mankind has been struggling to escape from the darkening prospect of mass destruction on earth ... Yesterday a shaft of light cut into the darkness." Kennedy expressed hope that the test ban would be the first step towards broader rapprochement, limit nuclear fallout, restrict nuclear proliferation, and slow the arms race in such a way that fortifies US security. Kennedy concluded his address in reference to a Chinese proverb that he had used with Khrushchev in Vienna two years prior. "'A journey of a thousand miles must begin with a single step,'" Kennedy said. "And if that journey is a thousand miles, or even more, let history record that we, in this land, at this time, took the first step."

In a speech in Moscow following the agreement, Khrushchev declared that the treaty would not end the arms race and by itself could not "avert the danger of war," and reiterated his proposal of a NATO-Warsaw Pact non-aggression accord. For Khrushchev, the test ban negotiations had long been a means of improving the Soviet Union's global image and reducing strain in relations with the West. There are also some indications that military experts within the Soviet Union saw a test ban as a way to restrict US development of tactical nuclear weapons, which could have increased US willingness to deploy small nuclear weapons on battlefields while circumventing the Soviet nuclear deterrent. Concern that a comprehensive ban would retard modernization of the Soviet arsenal may have pushed Khrushchev towards a partial ban. Counteracting the move towards a partial ban was Khrushchev's interest in reducing spending on testing, as underground testing was more expensive than the atmospheric tests the Soviet Union had been conducting; Khrushchev preferred a comprehensive ban as it would have eliminated the cost of testing entirely. Furthermore, there was internal concern about nuclear proliferation, particularly regarding the prospect of France and China crossing the threshold and the possibility of a multilateral NATO nuclear force, which was seen as a step towards West Germany acquiring nuclear weapons (the first Soviet test ban proposal in 1955 was made in the same month than West Germany joined NATO).

It was not until after the agreement was reached that the negotiators broached the question of France and China joining the treaty. Harriman proposed to Khrushchev that the US lobby France while the Soviet Union pursued a Chinese signature. "That's your problem," Khrushchev said in reply. Earlier, the Soviet ambassador to the US, Mikhail A. Menshikov, reportedly asked whether the US could "deliver the French." Both Kennedy and Macmillan personally called on de Gaulle to join, offering assistance to the French nuclear program in return. Nevertheless, on 29 July 1963, France announced it would not join the treaty. It was followed by China two days later.

China viewed the treaty as demonstrating a re-alignment by the United States and the Soviet Union against China, with Marshal Chen Yi characterizing the treaty as "targeted against us." Before the treaty was signed, Premier Zhou Enlai requested a report from the Second Ministry of Machine Building and relevant experts to address the implications. The experts asserted that the three countries participating in the ban had already conducted enough atmospheric tests such that the ban would have little impact on their nuclear programs. The participating countries could also continue underground testing and expand their arsenals. Accordingly, the group concluded that the purpose of the treaty was not to reduce the threat of nuclear conflict, but for the participating countries to retain their nuclear monopoly. The report provided the background for the PRC's statement upon the signing of the treaty that it was "a big fraud to fool the people of the world" and a ploy to impede China's development of nuclear weapons. Although not a signatory, China's government nonetheless felt international pressure to pursue underground testing. China conducted its first underground nuclear test in 1969.

On 5 August 1963, British Foreign Secretary Alec Douglas-Home, Soviet foreign minister Gromyko, and US Secretary of State Dean Rusk signed the final agreement.

==== After the Moscow agreement ====
Between 8 and 27 August 1963, the United States Senate Committee on Foreign Relations held hearings on the treaty. The Kennedy administration largely presented a united front in favor of the deal. Leaders of the once-opposed Joint Chiefs of Staff (JCS) and AEC acknowledged that the treaty would be of net benefit, though Teller, former members of the JCS and AEC, and the commander of the Strategic Air Command made clear their firm opposition. The opponents' argument centered on four themes. First, banning atmospheric tests would prevent the US from ensuring the hardness of its LGM-30 Minuteman missile silos and, second, from developing a capable missile defense system. Third, it was argued that the Soviet Union led the US in high-yield weapons (recall the Soviet Tsar Bomba test of 1961), which required atmospheric testing banned by the treaty, while the US led the Soviet Union in low-yield weapons, which were tested underground and would be permitted by the treaty. Fourth, the ban would prevent peaceful, civilian uses of nuclear detonations. Teller declared that the treaty would be a "step away from safety and possibly ... toward war."

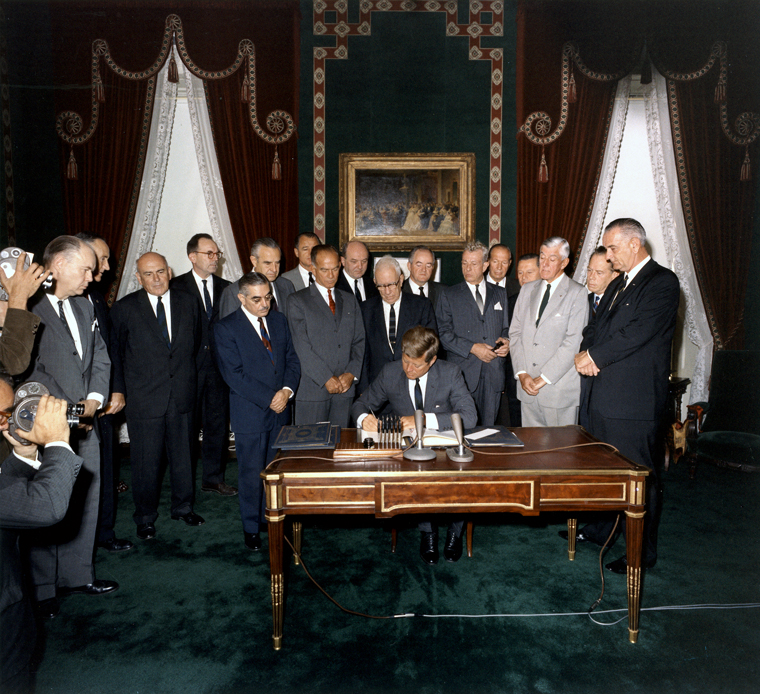
Kennedy signs the PTBT on 7 October 1963 before W. Averell Harriman, Lyndon B. Johnson, Dean Rusk, and others

Administration testimony sought to counteract these arguments. Defense Secretary Robert McNamara announced his "unequivocal support" for the treaty before the Foreign Relations Committee, arguing that US nuclear forces were secure and clearly superior to those of the Soviet Union, and that any major Soviet tests would be detected. Glenn T. Seaborg, the chairman of the AEC, also gave his support to the treaty in testimony, as did Harold Brown, the Department of Defense's lead scientist, and Norris Bradbury, the longtime director of the Los Alamos Laboratory. Maxwell D. Taylor, the Chairman of the Joint Chiefs of Staff, also testified in favor of the deal. Taylor and other members of the JCS, including Curtis LeMay, had made their support for the treaty conditional on four "safeguards": (1) a continued, aggressive underground testing program, (2) continued nuclear research programs, (3) continued readiness to resume atmospheric tests, and (4) improved verification equipment. Kennedy emphasized that the US would retain the ability to use nuclear weapons in war, would not be bound by the treaty if the Soviets violated it, and would continue an aggressive underground testing program. Kennedy also stressed that a ban would be a key step in preventing nuclear war.

The testimonies of the Joint Chiefs were seen as particularly effective in allaying concerns, as were the reassurances issued by Kennedy, who had acquired a reputation for resoluteness against the Soviet Union in the wake of the Cuban Missile Crisis. Additionally, a number of prominent Republicans came out in support of the deal, including Eisenhower, Eisenhower's vice president Richard Nixon, and Senator Everett Dirksen, who had initially been skeptical of the treaty. Eisenhower's science advisor and former PSAC head, George Kistiakowsky, endorsed the treaty. Former President Harry S. Truman also lent his support. Supporters of the deal mounted a significant pressure campaign, with active lobbying in favor by a range of civilian groups, including the United Automobile Workers/AFL–CIO, the National Committee for a Sane Nuclear Policy, Women Strike for Peace, and Methodist, Unitarian Universalist, and Reform Jewish organizations. Jerome Wiesner, the chairman of PSAC, later said that this public advocacy was a primary motivation for Kennedy's push for a test ban. Civil opposition to the deal was less prominent, though the Veterans of Foreign Wars announced opposition to the deal along with the International Council of Christian Churches, which rejected a "covenant with a godless power." Polling in late August 1963 indicated that more than 60% of Americans supported the deal while less than 20% opposed it.

On 3 September 1963, the Foreign Relations Committee approved the treaty by a 16–1 vote. On 24 September 1963, the US Senate voted 80–14 to approve ratification of the treaty, exceeding the necessary two-thirds majority by 14 votes. The Soviet Union ratified the treaty the following day with a unanimous vote of the Presidium of the Supreme Soviet. On 10 October 1963, the treaty entered into effect.

== Implementation ==
=== Provisions ===
The treaty declares as its "principal aim the speediest possible achievement of an agreement on general and complete disarmament under strict international control" and explicitly states the goal of achieving a comprehensive test ban (one that bans underground tests). The treaty permanently forbids the parties to the treaty from conducting, permitting, or encouraging any nuclear explosion in the atmosphere, outer space, or underwater as well as "any other nuclear explosion" that threatens to send nuclear debris into another state's territory. The wording "any other nuclear explosion" prohibited peaceful nuclear explosions because of the difficulty in differentiating those from military tests without expanded verification measures.

According to the compromise reached by U.S. delegates Adrian S. Fisher and John McNaughton in Moscow, Article 3 of the treaty permits states to deposit instruments of ratification or accession with the governments of the United Kingdom, the Soviet Union, or the United States. This arrangement effectively avoids the issue of the treaty appearing to legitimize governments that lack universal recognition. Article 4 embodies the compromise reached by Gromyko and Harriman in Moscow regarding withdrawal from the treaty. It acknowledges the sovereign right of states to withdraw, as emphasized by Khrushchev, while also explicitly granting parties the right to withdraw if "extraordinary events... have jeopardized the supreme interests of its country," in accordance with the demands of the United States.

=== Signatories ===
By 15 April 1964, six months after the PTBT went into effect, more than 100 states had joined the treaty as signatories and 39 had ratified or acceded to it. The most recent party to the PTBT is Montenegro, which succeeded to the treaty in 2006. As of 2015, 126 states were party to the treaty, with 10 other states having signed but not deposited instruments of ratification. There are 60 states that have not signed the PTBT, including the nuclear states of China, France, and North Korea. Albania, an ideological ally of China during the PTBT's enactment, also has not signed.

=== Effectiveness ===
Bomb pulse atmospheric carbon-14 (^{14}C) in the Southern and Northern Hemispheres. Atmospheric testing almost doubled the concentration of ^{14}C in the Northern Hemisphere.

The ratification of the PTBT coincided with a significant decline in the levels of radioactive particles in the atmosphere, following the "bomb spike" of the early 1960s. However, it did not effectively stop the proliferation of nuclear weapons. One year after the PTBT's entry into force, the nonsignatory China conducted the 596 test and became the world's fifth nuclear power. Since China, four other states are known or believed to have acquired nuclear weapons. However, the PTBT has been credited with slowing proliferation because of the greater expense associated with underground tests. Kennedy had warned in 1963 that without a test ban, there could be 10 nuclear states by 1970 and 15 to 20 by 1975.

The decade following ratification of the PTBT (1963–1972) featured more US nuclear tests than the decade prior (1953–1962). In the following decade, the US conducted 385 nuclear tests and 23 peaceful nuclear explosions (PNEs), as opposed to 268 tests and three PNEs in the prior decade. In contrast, the number of Soviet detonations fell from 218 in the preceding decade to 157 in the following decade, as the Soviet Union was never able to meet the pace of US underground explosions. China and France, both nonsignatories, conducted 53 tests between 1963 and 1973. In all, 436 tests were conducted between the signing of the PTBT and 1 July 1973, compared to 499 tests between 16 July 1945 and the signing of the PTBT. In the 1960s and the 1970s, China conducted 22 atmospheric tests and France conducted 50. The last atmospheric test was conducted by China in 1980, after French atmospheric testing stopped in 1974. Public opposition to nuclear testing continued after the treaty's enactment. Greenpeace was founded in 1971 in opposition to a planned underground test on the Alaskan island of Amchitka. In 1982, a Greenpeace ship docked at Leningrad without permission to demand the Soviet Union to stop testing.

The PTBT was a first of a series of nuclear arms control treaties in the second half of 20th century. The PTBT has been considered the stepping stone to the Treaty on the Non-Proliferation of Nuclear Weapons (NPT) of 1968, which explicitly referred to the progress provided by the PTBT. In addition to the NPT, the PTBT was followed within ten years by the Outer Space Treaty and Treaty of Tlatelolco in 1967, the Seabed Arms Control Treaty in 1971, and the Anti-Ballistic Missile Treaty in 1972. In 1974, the Threshold Test Ban Treaty prohibited underground tests with yields above 150 kilotons.

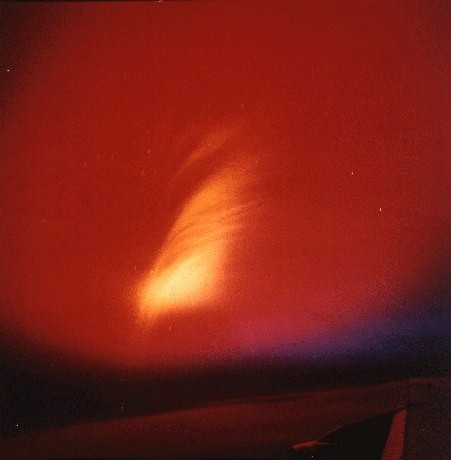
Image of Starfish Prime nuclear test in space (1962). Such tests in space and high-altitudes stopped completely with the treaty.

In October 1977, the original parties to the PTBT renewed discussions about establishing a comprehensive test ban in Geneva. By the end of the 1970s, the US, the UK, and the Soviet Union reached an agreement on draft provisions that would prohibit all testing, temporarily ban peaceful nuclear explosions (PNEs), and establish a verification system that included on-site inspections. However, the parties remained divided over the specific details of the verification process, and the talks ultimately came to a halt with the departure of President Jimmy Carter in 1981.

Momentum towards a comprehensive ban re-emerged under Mikhail Gorbachev and President Ronald Reagan, with Gorbachev initiating a testing moratorium in 1985. In December 1986, the US indicated support for the "long-term objective" of a comprehensive ban, followed by the commencement of testing negotiations between the US and Soviet Union in November 1987. In December 1987, the US and the Soviet Union agreed to a joint program of experiments on detecting underground tests. In August 1988, Indonesia, Mexico, Peru, Sri Lanka, Venezuela, and Yugoslavia petitioned to transform the PTBT into a comprehensive ban by extending the treaty to underground tests. At a conference on the plan in January 1991, the US indicated that it would not permit efforts to achieve a comprehensive ban by consensus with amendments to the PTBT.

Throughout the 1990s, progress accelerated towards a comprehensive test ban treaty (CTBT). Following a series of international meetings on the subject, the UN General Assembly approved Resolution 50/64, which appealed for states to follow the PTBT and called for conclusion of the CTBT talks. In September 1996, the Comprehensive Nuclear-Test-Ban Treaty was signed and superseded the PTBT, but the PTBT is still in effect for states not party to the CTBT. The CTBT has yet to enter into force, as 8 required states have not ratified the treaty, including the US and China. France, Russia, and the UK have ratified the CTBT. The technology for detecting underground tests has significantly improved since the 1950s and 1960s, with monitors detecting tests down to 1 kiloton with a high degree of confidence.

==== Violations and accidents ====
Early compliance with the PTBT was believed to be good, but there have been a number of accidental releases of nuclear debris into the atmosphere by parties to the treaty. Additionally, "venting" of underground tests by the US and the Soviet Union also continued to release radioactive debris into the atmosphere. Fully contained underground tests were not wholly "clean" either. Underground testing reduced the risk caused by radionuclides with short half-lives, such as iodine-131, and is generally safer than other forms of testing. However, underground testing may also cause long-lived radionuclides, including caesium-135, iodine-129, and plutonium, to seep into the ground.

A notable atmospheric release of radioactive gas followed the Soviet Chagan test of 15 January 1965 in present-day Kazakhstan. Roughly 20% of the radioactive debris produced by the 140-kiloton detonation was released into the atmosphere, with some fallout occurring over Japan. The US complained to Moscow, but no subsequent action was taken. On 25 April 1966, the Pin Stripe underground test in Nevada (part of Operation Flintlock) experienced a venting malfunction and produced a radioactive plume headed towards the Midwestern United States; the AEC determined that the test did not threaten human health.

Another accidental release occurred following the Baneberry shot at the Nevada Test Site on 18 December 1970 (part of Operation Emery). The 10-kiloton underground detonation created a fissure in the ground, allowing radioactive gas to escape into the atmosphere. Radioactive material released by the fissure reached an altitude of 10,000 feet (3,000 m) and exposed 86 workers to radiation but none at excessive levels. The incident has since been described as one of the "world's worst nuclear disasters."

Declassified US documents indicate that the US may have violated the PTBT's ban on atmospheric testing in 1972 by, at the instruction of Henry Kissinger, monitoring and collecting data on French atmospheric tests over the Pacific Ocean, which may have amounted to co-operation with the French program. Declassified documents also indicate that the US and the UK circumvented the prescribed verification system in 1964–65 by establishing a series of additional control posts in Australia, Fiji, Mauritius, Pakistan, and South Africa.

The 1979 Vela incident in the southern Atlantic may have been an atmospheric nuclear test in contravention of the PTBT by Israel and South Africa, both of which were parties to the treaty.

On 8 January 1988, Colonel Chang Hsien-yi, Deputy director of National Atomic Research Institute (NARI) of Republic of China defected to the United States, and revealed its progress of nuclear weapon development, followed by the sudden death of President Chiang Ching-kuo on 13 January. On 20 January, David Ding, Director of Taipei Economic and Cultural Representative Office of Taipei Representative Office, met General Hau Pei-tsun, Chief of the General Staff of Republic of China Armed Forces in Taipei, and presented the U.S. reconnaissance satellite images showing a minimized nuclear explosion at the test field of NARI Jiupeng base in 1986; then demanded to respect the agreement of President Ronald Reagan and the new president Lee Teng-hui to terminate Taiwan's nuclear weapons development plan and to return 699 nuclear fuel rods back to the United States. Under the supervision of International Atomic Energy Agency and U.S. officials, classified data were confiscated, and the nuclear reactor was sealed. Following that six hydrogen material explosions and a heavy fire occurred later, it eventually took three years to complete the rods' transportation.

== See also ==
- Air Force Technical Applications Center – US organization dedicated to monitoring nuclear treaty compliance
- Boeing WC-135 Constant Phoenix – US aircraft used to detect nuclear explosions
- National technical means of verification (NTM)
- Project Orion (nuclear propulsion) – US project that ended shortly after ratification of the PTBT
- Comprehensive Nuclear-Test-Ban Treaty (CTBT)
- Treaty on the Non-Proliferation of Nuclear Weapons (NPT)
- Treaty on the Prohibition of Nuclear Weapons (TPNW)
