= Erich Bethe =

German classical philologist (1863–1940)

- Born: 2 May 1863
- Died: 19 October 1940 (aged 77)
- Occupation: Educator
- Spouse: Margarethe Loewe-Bethe

Erich Julius Adolf Bethe (2 May 1863 – 19 October 1940) was a German classical philologist who was a native of Stettin.

In 1887, he earned his doctorate from the University of Göttingen, later receiving his habilitation at Bonn in 1891. From 1893 to 1897, he was an associate professor at the University of Rostock, afterwards serving as a professor of classical philology at the Universities of Basel (1897-1903), Giessen (1903–06) and Leipzig (1906-1931). In 1927–28, he was rector at the University of Leipzig.

Bethe was married to the German painter Margarethe Loewe-Bethe.

In 1933, Bethe signed the Vow of allegiance of the Professors of the German Universities and High-Schools to Adolf Hitler and the National Socialistic State.

His better known publications are as follows:

- Thebanische Heldenlieder (Theban heroic songs), 1891.
- Prolegomena zur Geschichte des Theaters im Alterthum (Prolegomena on the history of theaters in antiquity), 1896.
- Homer, Dichtung und Sage (Homer, poetry and legend), 1914.
- Der troische Epenkreis (The troische epic spheres), 1919
- Griechische Lyrik (Greek lyric poetry), 1920.
- Marchen, sage, mythus (Fable, legend, myth), 1922.
- Die griechische Dichtung (Greek poetry), 1924.
- Tausend jahre altgriechischen lebens (Millennium of ancient Greek life), 1933.
- Ahnenbild und familiengeschichte bei Römern und Griechen (Ancestral imagery and family history among the Romans and Greeks), 1935.

== Literature ==
- Erich Burck: Leipzig 1921–1925: Richard Heinze (1867–1929), Alfred Körte (1866–1946), Erich Bethe (1863–1940). In: Eikasmós. Band 4, 1993, S. 61–70.
- Otto Kern: Erich Bethe †. In: Gnomon. Band 17 (1941), S. 142–144
- Herbert Helbig: Bethe, Erich Julius Adolf. In: Neue Deutsche Biographie (NDB). Band 2, Duncker & Humblot, Berlin 1955, ISBN 3-428-00183-4, S. 185
