= Margarethe Loewe-Bethe =

German painter

- Born: Margarethe Loewe; 1859; Province of Silesia
- Died: 1932 (aged 72–73); Leipzig, Germany
- Known for: Painting
- Spouse: Erich Bethe

Margarethe Loewe-Bethe (1859–1932) was a German painter.

== Biography ==
Loewe-Bethe née Loewe was born in 1859 in the Province of Silesia. She was married to Erich Bethe (1863-1940). Loewe-Bethe exhibited her work at the Woman's Building at the 1893 World's Columbian Exposition in Chicago, Illinois.

Loewe-Bethe died in 1932 in Leipzig.

The spellings of the artist's name include Margarethe Loewe-Bethe, Margarethe Löewe and Margarethe Bethe-Löwe, Margarete Loewe, and Margarethe Bethe. The German Wikipedia article lists her as Margarete Loewe.

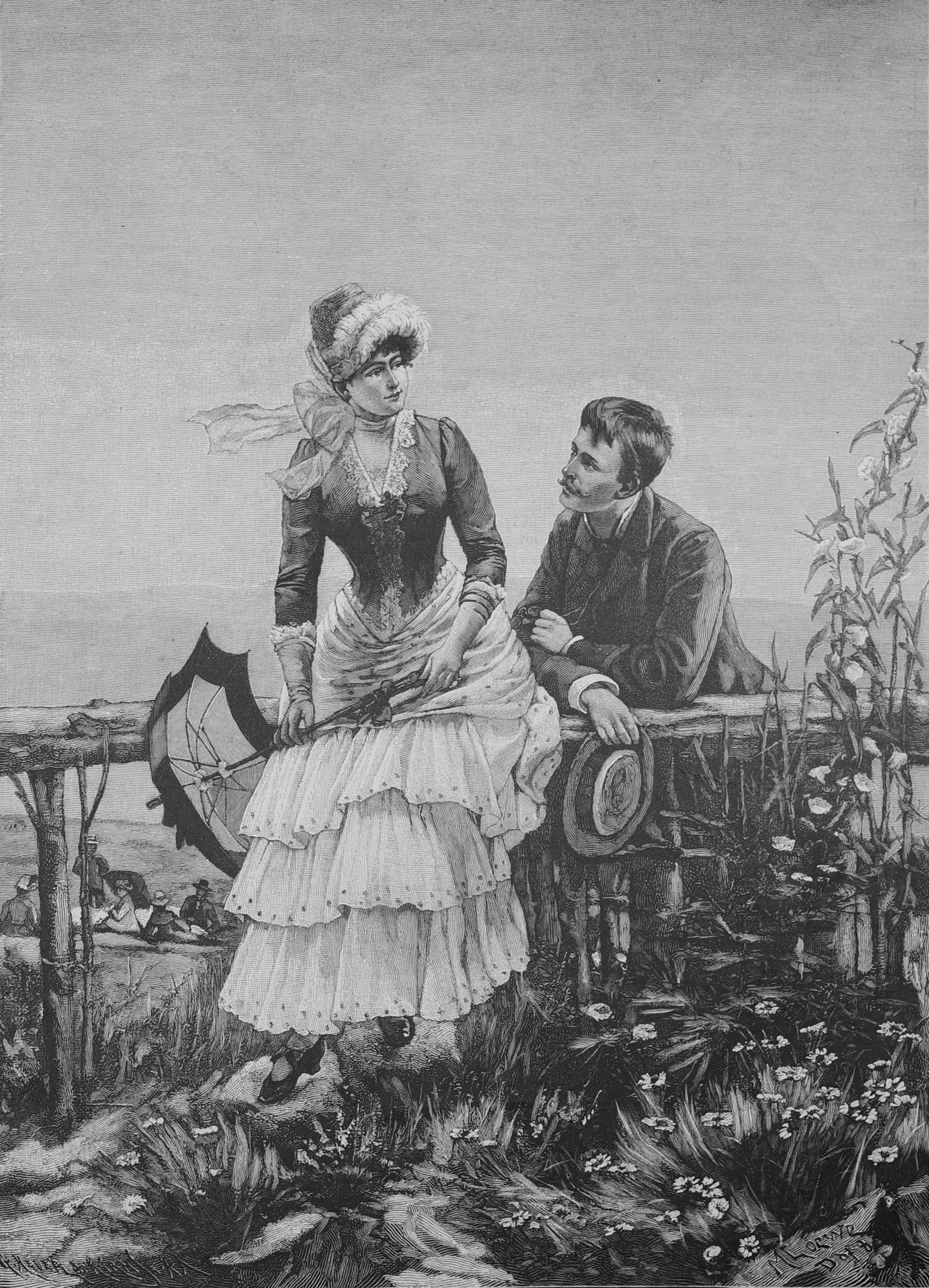
Engraving after the painting On the Landpartie by Margarete Loewe

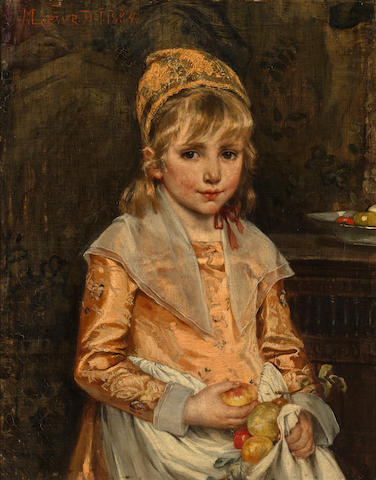
Girl with Apples by Margarethe Loewe-Bethe, 1884
