= Mickaël Bethe-Selassié =

Ethiopian artist (1951–2020)

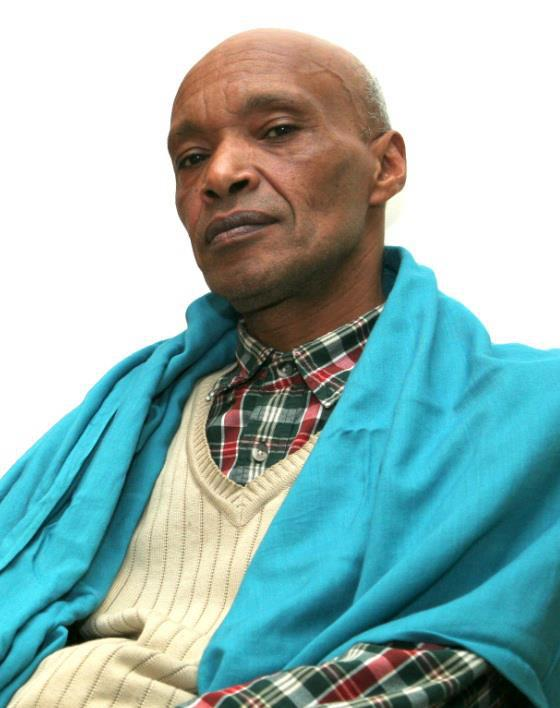
Mickaël Bethe-Selassié

Mickaël Bethe-Selassié (1951–2020) was an Ethiopian artist who was characterized by his works and colorful representations often made with large-scale papier-mâché. He is also recognized for works made with paint and reliefs.

== Biography ==
Mickaël Bethe-Selassié was born on 15 February 1951, in Dire Dawa, in a small village in eastern Ethiopia. He was the youngest of three brothers. When he was barely two years old in 1953, his father died, causing his mother to make the decision to move to the capital of Ethiopia, Addis Ababa. He lived in the capital at his grandparents' house where he spent a large part of his life where he studied until high school. He lived in France most of his life and this is where he worked after leaving Ethiopia. His mother, who worked at Menelik Hospital, died in 1974. During his stay in France, he had several moments of crisis when he was not clear about his interests, so he was forced to work in small jobs to be able to have some money. It was not until the age of thirty that he began to venture into the arts.

== Education ==
His education began in the capital of Ethiopia, Addis Ababa, which was where he began high school and had his first interests in some branches of science. He studied at the French school Lycee Gebre Mariam where he obtained a scholarship to have the possibility of studying in France. Once he graduated in 1970, he decided to leave Ethiopia in search of gaining a better knowledge of fine arts. In 1971, he arrived in France was where he would live and work until his death in December 2020. During his time at college, one of his interests were multiple branches of science, such as history, chemistry, or anthropology.

His beginnings in art came through the medium of painting. Upon his arrival in France and not having a great fascination with the sciences to study them in their entirety in his moments of boredom in his studio, he had the opportunity to start painting the walls of the studio. As he created elements with paint, he decided to add more elements by integrating clay, fabric, and paper to give life to his characters. It was not until his 30s that his first interventions in the art of sculpture were seen. However, much of the art began later in his life. Part of the development of his art was also due to his fascination with world religions. His ideas and ways of seeing the world were influenced by Catholicism and Zen Buddhism which helped him further develop his art.

== Art work ==
The vast majority of Mickaël Bethe-Selassié's works are usually sold at auction but there are some works which are preserved in various prestigious institutions around the world. One of the places where it is possible to find samples of his work is the National Museum of African Art in Washington, DC. In addition, the impact of his works has been so great that they were even exhibited in 2011 at the SBK in Amsterdam. Most of his works can be found at auctions which range between 400 and 1000 euros depending on the complexity of the works.

== Style ==
Bethe-Selassié's works are distinguished by preserving irregular and organic shapes, in addition to having the mixture of multiple colors where details of Ethiopian culture can be appreciated. His work becomes related to the tradition of Jean Dubuffet and also to the characteristics of art brut. Much of his works are associated with these terms due to the simple but highly expressive forms that make them up. The representation of these range from the characterization of royalty, animals and even warriors.

The artist's creative process is heavily influenced by Ethiopian culture, particularly by Coptic paintings and the symbolism of the cross, which inspire his work. His paintings often depict people, characterized by vibrant colors and a variety of materials, creating lively and festive figures. However, he faced exile from Ethiopia during the rule of the Marxist military government. Upon returning, he sought to showcase his understanding of Ethiopian arts and culture, drawing from his experiences in the diaspora.

The artist's work has been criticizeed for being primitive. Having lived for many years in France he allowed his art to be influenced by everything that the French art scene of that time represented. Something very characteristic of his way of working was that he never made preparatory sketches or models for the creation of his sculptures and simply worked with his materials in the most direct way possible. This approach formed the notion of what he wanted to capture in the sculptures, which resulted in improvisation. This technique created a sympathetic feeling very close to the surrealist aesthetic. Some find similarities with outsider art while others find more Western characteristics in his works, making them believe that his style establishes parallels with Karel Appel.

== Mégalithe ==
Mégalithe

Mégalithe is a sculpture showcased at the National Museum of African Art, acquired through funding from the Annie Laurie Aitken Foundation. This artwork embodies the creative vision of Mickaël Bethe-Selassié, incorporating elements of his Ethiopian heritage and showcasing the artistic techniques he employs in all his creations. This vertical sculpture, created in 1991, stands out as one of the primary works that authentically captures the distinctive characteristics of its artistic style. This piece is primarily crafted from paper mâché and painted on three sides. It features a face at the top and intricate details throughout the body, symbolizing aspects of Ethiopian culture through the depiction of small characters with unique shapes. The vibrant use of colors, including blue, red, and yellow, adds to the visual impact of the artwork.

== Guerrillero and Mama Africa ==
Guerrillero and Mama Africa are two sculptures crafted from polychrome papier-mâché on wire mesh wood, with dimensions measuring Height: 245 cm, Width: 92 cm, and Depth: 80 cm. These artworks incorporate materials such as fabric, cork ceramic elements, raffia hair, and necklaces. Adorned with a vibrant palette including yellow, orange, red, brown, blue, and black, these sculptures feature intricate details. A notable feature of these sculptures is the expression depicted on their faces: Guerrillero conveys astonishment, while Mama Africa reflects surprise. The sculptures include elements of Ethiopian culture, such as the use of lines, inorganic shapes, colors, and detailed adornments like earrings and clothing. These sculptures were shown at Halle Saint Pierre in Paris in 1993.

== Arche Croix et Totem ==
Arche Croix et Totem is a sculpture, constructed from polychrome papier mâché and positioned atop a wooden grille, showcases an intricate architectural arch adorned with small windows and dual bases. Embedded within the composition are figurines portraying animals and characters characterized by cartoonish features. The color scheme exhibits a wide spectrum, prominently featuring red and green hues. Noteworthy inscriptions resembling newspaper elements, predominantly rendered in black paint, are observable on the sculpture's bases. The base itself is crafted from wood, contributing to the overall structure. The dimensions of the sculpture are as follows: Height: 365 cm, Width: 180 cm, Depth: 104 cm. This significant artwork has been displayed in esteemed museums such as the Halle Saint-Pierre in Paris and the Addis Ababa Museum in Ethiopia, contributing to its recognition within the artistic community.

== Voyage Initiatique ==
Voyage Initiatique is a sculpture created in 1994, made of paper mâché. It measures 64 x 58 x 35 1/2 inches and depicts two figurines on a cart, as if on an exploration journey. The sculpture features colors like orange, green, blue, and brown, giving it a vivid appearance. The title Voyage Initiatique refers to the initiation rituals young people undergo as they become adults. It also symbolizes the travels young Ethiopians make through different areas, both physical and psychological. This sculpture can be seen at the National Museum of African Art in Washington, D.C.

== Solo exhibitions ==
- 2007 "Univers Phénico-Sabéen", Saint-Hilaire-de-Riez.
- 2006 Huijs Basten Asbeck, Groenlo, Nederland.
- 2005/06 Espace Cosmopolis, Nantes Château des Carmes, La Flèche
- 2004 Maison des Sciences de l'Homme, Paris "abba Dia -Abbadia", Médiathèque François Mitterrand, Hendaye Asni gallery - Addis Abeba, Ethiopia
- 2002 Galerie de la Halle Saint Pierre, Paris Parnas Huis voor Kunst en Cultuur, Leeuwarden, Nederland
- 2000 Gallery Vromans, Amsterdam, Nederland
- 1999 "Het Magische Woud", Tropenmuseum, Amsterdam, Nederland
- 1998 "Tour de Planète", Commerzbank, Frankfurt, Deutschland Tour Abbatiale-Musée, Saint-Amand-Les Eaux
- 1997 Galerie Virus, Antwerpen, Belgique Kulturverein Zehntscheuer E.V, Rottenburg, Deutschland
- 1996 Galerie 2X20, Arnhem, Nederland Collégiale Saint -Pierre-Le-Puellier, Orléans De Stadshof Museum, Zwolle, Nederland
- 1995 "Living Paper", Dany Keller Gallery, Deutschland Musée des Beaux Arts de Chartres
- 1994 "The Sacred Forest, The October gallery, London Galerie la Lune en Parachute, Epinal Haus der Kulturen der Welt, Berlin, Deutschland
- 1993 "Croix et Totems", Halle Saint- Pierre, Paris Addis Abeba Museum, Ethiopie
- 1992 Afrika Cultural Center, Johannesburg, South Africa Galerie Loft, Windhoek, Namibia Centre Culturel franco-namibien Dany Keller gallery, Munich, Deutschland Ancien Musée des Automates, Paris
- 1989-91 Galerie Horloge, Paris
- 1987 Galerie Bonino, Rio de Janeiro, Brésil Galerie Mab, Salvador, Brésil Palais des Arts, Belo horizonte, Brésil
- 1986 "Printemps au Jardin", Paris
- 1985 Galerie la Licorne, Paris

== Group exhibitions ==
- 2008 Abroethiopia, Asni gallery, Addis Abeba, Ethiopie
- 2007 Ethiopia-millénium, Palais de l'Unesco, Paris "Terre Noire", musée Maurice Denis, Saint Germain en Laye
- 2006 Asni gallery, Addis Abeba, Ethiopie
- 2005/6 "African Voices", Museum of World Cultures, Göteborg, Sweden Musée Bonnat, Bayonne
- 2003 "Ethiopian Pasages", N.M.A.A., Smithsonian Institutuion, Washington
- 2002 Symposium international de sculptures - Corée du Sud
- 2001 Atelier VII - La Guéroulde - France
- 2000 Symposium international de sculptures - Corée du Sud "Les Enfants du Monde", Les Rendez-Vous Toyota, Paris Art -Box project, Hanover, Deutschland "L'Afrique à Jour", Lille
- 1998 "Visa pour 100 Papiers ", Centre Culturel la Rairie "Afrika ist überall", Eisenstadt, Autriche Triennale der Kleinplastik, Stuttgart, Deutschland. "Contemporary African Art", WorldSpace, Washington, U.S.A. Centre Culturel Albert Camus, Tananarive, Madagascar
- 1997 "Papiersculpture" Landesgalerie, Linz, Autriche "Ethiopie en Fête", Forum Culturel, Blanc Mesnil "Suites Africaines", Couvent des Cordeliers, Paris
- 1996 "Aethiopia", Musée Royal d'Afrique Central, Tervuren, Belgique "The Other Journey", Kunsthalle Krems, Autriche
- 1995 Bomani Gallery, San Francisco, USA "Dialogues de Paix", Genève, Suisse Foire de Cologne (D. Keller Gallery), Deutschland
- 1994-1995 "Otro Païs", exposition itinérante, Espagne
- 1994 "De l'Afrique à l'Afrique", Tunis, Tunisie
- 1993 "Présence Africaine", Villa du Parc, Annemasse Musée d'Art Moderne, Monterey, USA "Africa : Skulptur Heute", D. Keller Gallery, Munich, Deutschland "Us Project", organisé par Peter Gabriel
- 1992 "Paris Connections : African Artists in Paris", Bomani Gallery, San Francisco "Passeport sans visa", Cloître des Dames Blanches, La Rochelle
- 1991 "Les Atotémiques", Galerie Oz-Ekla, Paris Foire d'Art Contemporain, Rouen
- 1990 "Façades Imaginaires", Grenoble "Afrique en Fête", Palais de l'Unesco, Paris
- 1989 Centre Culturel Français, Belgrade
- 1988 "Singuliers, Bruts ou Naïfs?", Musée d'Art Moderne de la Ville de Paris
- 1987 Festival France-Ethnicolor, "Cirque d'Hiver", Paris
- 1986 Sculptures polychromes, Eymoutiers

== Award ==
2010

BETHE-SÉLASSIÉ, Mickaël. La jeune Éthiopie : un haut fonctionnaire éthiopien, Berhanä-Marqos Wäldä-Tsadeq, 1892-1943.

Paris: l’Harmattan, 2009
