= Tehran International Conference on Disarmament and Non-Proliferation =

International Conference in Tehran, Iran

International Conference on Disarmament and Non-Proliferation, 2010
- Host country: Iran
- Dates: 17–18 April 2010

Iran convened a conference titled "International Disarmament and Non-proliferation: World Security without Weapons of Mass Destruction" on 17 and 18 April 2010 in Tehran. The theme of the conference was Nuclear Energy for All, Nuclear Weapons for No One.

The conference resulted in Iranian president Mahmoud Ahmadinejad's call for action toward the elimination of all nuclear weapons.

== Background ==
The New START treaty was signed on 8 April 2010, in Prague by US president Barack Obama and Russian president Dmitry Medvedev. This treaty resumed the START process of reducing the number of nuclear weapons in the two nations, for the first time requiring verifiability between them.

The conference was held just days after a Nuclear Security Summit was held in Washington, DC on 12–14 April over the security of "vulnerable nuclear material." This conference was viewed as a counterpoint to the Washington summit. Its intention was to prove Iran's national and political will for the eradication of nuclear weapons, where Iran said the chemical weapons convention determined such weapons should be destroyed but the United States had chosen to ignore it.

In May 2010, the review conference for the Non-Proliferation Treaty (NPT) was held at United Nations headquarters in New York City.

In May 2009, the EastWest Institute released a joint US-Russian Threat Assessment on Iran's Nuclear and Missile Potential. The report said there was no specific evidence that Iran was seeking the ability to attack Europe and that "it is indeed difficult to imagine the circumstances in which Iran would do so." It added that if Iran did pursue this capability, it would need six to eight years to develop a missile capable of carrying a 1,000 kilogram warhead 2,000 kilometers; and that Iran ending "IAEA containment and surveillance of the nuclear material and all installed cascades at the Fuel Enrichment Plan" might serve as an early warning of Iranian intentions. The report concluded that there was "no IRBM/ICBM threat from Iran and that such a threat, even if it were to emerge, is not imminent." Incoming Director General of the International Atomic Energy Agency, Yukiya Amano said he had not seen any evidence in IAEA official documents that Iran was seeking the ability to develop nuclear weapons.

== Participants ==
Experts and officials from about 60 countries were invited to the conference. As of 15 April only 35 countries had indicated they would send delegations, 24 of whom would be Foreign or Deputy Foreign Ministers. Many non-governmental organisations were also to be present.

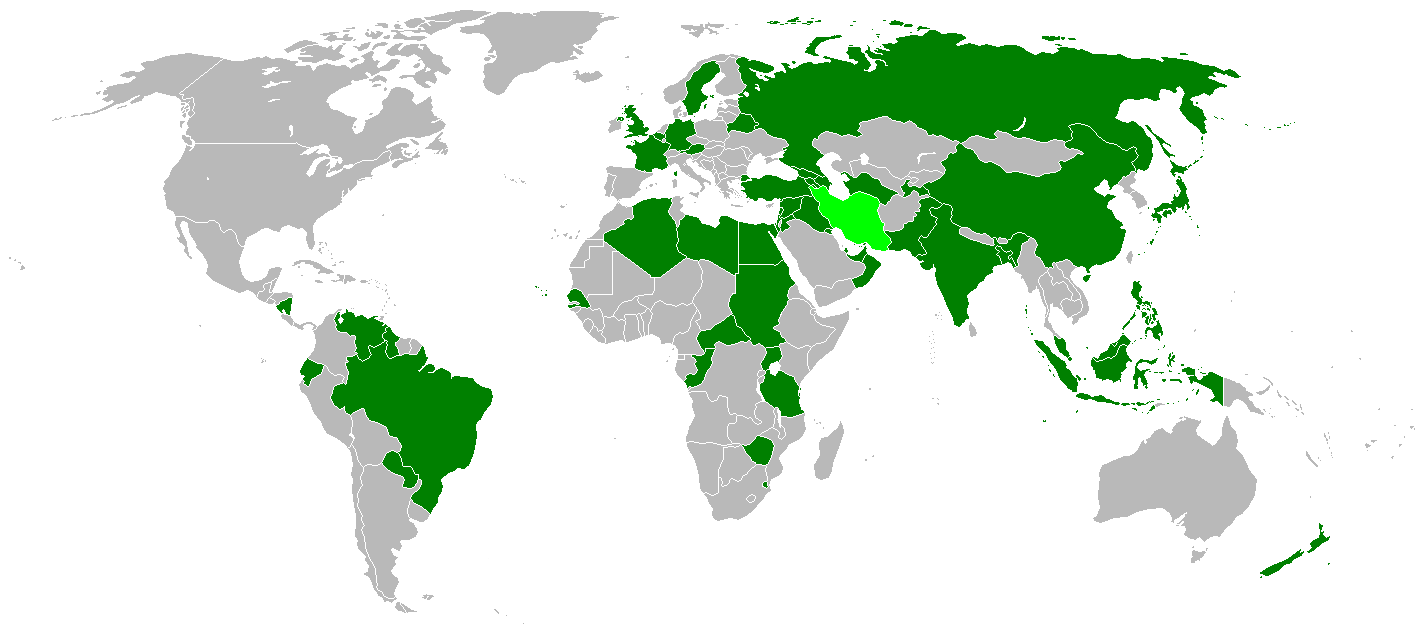
Countries attending the summit.

Country	Name	Title
Arab League	Vael al-Assad	Representative
Atomic Energy Organization of Iran	Ali Akbar Salehi	Vice President and Head
CTBTO	Jean Du Preez	Representative
International Atomic Energy Agency		
Organisation of the Islamic Conference	Ekmeleddin İhsanoğlu	Secretary General
United Nations	Taijiro Kimura	Director of the UN Regional Centre for Peace and Disarmmament for Asia and the Pacific
Armenia	Edward Nalbandian	Foreign Minister
Algeria	Ben Shahedani	General Director of the Diplomatic Relationship and International Security of Algeria
Austria		
Azerbaijan		
Bangladesh		
Belarus	Victor Rybak	Ambassador
Belgium		
Brazil		
Brunei Darussalam		
Cape Verde		
Central African Republic		
China	Cheng Guoping	Assistant Foreign Minister
Republic of the Congo		
Cuba		
Ecuador		
Egypt		
France		
Germany		
Georgia		
Guyana		
India	Sh. Gaddam Dharmendra	General Director of Disarmament and International Security of India
Indonesia	Marty Natalegawa	Minister of Foreign Affairs of Unitary Republic of Indonesia
Iran host	Mahmoud Ahmadinejad	President
Iraq	Jalal Talabani / Hoshyar Zebari	President / Foreign Minister
Italy		
Japan		
Jordan		
Kuwait	Mohammad Abdullah Abu Al-Hassan	Special envoy
Lebanon	Ali al-Shami	Minister of Foreign Affairs
Libya		
Malaysia	Dato Lee Chee Leong	Deputy Foreign Minister
New Zealand		
Nicaragua		
Oman	Yussef bin Alawai bin Abdullah	Foreign Minister
Pakistan	M. B. Abbasi	Ambassador
Paraguay		
Philippines		Ambassador
Qatar	Mahammed ben Abdollah al—Romeihi	Deputy Foreign Minister
Russia	Sergei Ryabkov	Deputy Foreign Minister
Senegal		
Singapore	Umej Bhatia	Counselor to the Foreign Minister
Sudan		
Swaziland		
Sweden		
Switzerland		
Syrian Arab Republic	Walid Muallem	Foreign Minister
Tajikistan		
Tanzania	Juma	Ambassador
Turkmenistan	Gurbanguly Berdimuhamedow / Rasid Meredov	President / Foreign Minister
Turkey	Hakki Akil	Deputy Foreign Minister
Uganda	Okello Oryem	Minister of State for International Affairs
United Arab Emirates		
United Kingdom		
Venezuela	Jorge Valero	Deputy Foreign Minister
Zimbabwe	Borniface Chidyausiku	Permanent Representative to the United Nations

- The US was officially registered as a participant, but denied having been invited (see controversies).

== Issues ==
The conference was composed of three panels focusing on the following topics:

- Disarmament challenges;
- International obligations of States for disarmament and non-proliferation and consequences of the continued existence of WMDs;
- Practical steps for the materialization of disarmament.

Iranian foreign minister Manouchehr Mottaki said he had "stressed that nuclear energy must be for everybody. While [the Washington summit] discussed the protection of nuclear material, in this coming conference we will emphasise the necessity of disarmament."

== Discussions ==
Supreme Leader of Iran Ayatollah Seyyed Ali Khamenei sent a message to the nuclear disarmament conference clarifying that "Iran regards using nuclear weapons as forbidden in Islam and it is incumbent on everyone to safeguard humanity from such weapons," while "every nation is entitled to the peaceful use of this technology." He called the US the world's "only nuclear scofflaw" for its advocating of arms control while maintaining a huge nuclear arsenal of its own as well as support for Israel notwithstanding their nuclear arsenal despite not being a signatory of the Nuclear Nonproliferation Treaty (NPT). (The US and Iran are signatories of the NPT.)

Ahmadinejad said that "threatening with nuclear weapons only dishonoured the American government officials and more fully exposed their inhumane and aggressive policies." He also called for more rigorous action than that outlined by the US summit. His comments drew applause when he called for the destruction of all atomic weapons, starting with those in the US arsenal. He further called on the US to end its "blind support" for Israel, which he estimated has 200 atomic warheads but has failed to sign the NPT. Ayatollah Ali Khamenei reiterated a religious edict he had issued earlier against the use of all nuclear weapons, and called the nuclear arsenal of the US "tools of terror and intimidation." Iranian Foreign Minister Manouchehr Mottaki said that a nuclear weapons-free Middle East requires "the Zionist regime [Israel] to join the NPT." This was seen as a call for Israel to open up its nuclear facilities to international inspectors. The Secretary General of the Organisation of the Islamic Conference, Ekmeleddin Ihsanoglu, added that "Israel should ink the NPT without any waste of time," adding that the Middle East should be turned into a region free from nuclear weapons. He also called for tangible measures in this regard, and cautioned that "Either you should destroy the WMDs or they will kill us."

The head of Iran's Atomic Energy Organisation Ali Akbar Salehi said the NPT was under threat as it currently stood. "If countries armed with nuclear weapons want to respect and bolster NPT, they should fully fulfill their pledges to this end. There is no doubt that [the] continuation of [a] nuclear arms race and adoption of dual-standard policies in dealing with peaceful nuclear energy will create a challenge for the world. If policies such as selective approaches, use of language of threat, unjust and dual standard policies are not halted at the earliest opportunities, NPT will lose its legitimacy and the IAEA will be deviated from its main principles." He added that "interference [from] certain western countries [are] weakening of the NPT's letter of association, the body is now serving [the] United Nations Security Council which pursues politically-motivated policies of [a] few countries." In this vein, the Secretary of Iran's Supreme National Security Council of Iran, Saeed Jalili, called for strengthening of the nuclear Non-Proliferation Treaty (NPT) as the only way to stop nuclear proliferation. According to IRNA, Jalili said "preventing Major powers from imposing their influence on the International Atomic Energy Agency (IAEA) is another way of promoting nuclear disarmament and non-proliferation and strengthening of NPT." As Iranian chief nuclear negotiator, Jalili, underlined Tehran's commitment to dialogue to remove concerns through the implementation of undertakings of all the relevant sides. He put forward a proposal which consists of three pillars:

- A clear timetable be drawn up for the elimination of all nuclear weapons and an international verification mechanism for the nuclear activities of nuclear-weapon states. This verification mechanism should be similar to the one used to verify the fulfillment of commitments by non-nuclear weapon states under article 3 of NPT.
- A fact-finding committee to be established by the IAEA to investigate the sources of proliferation of nuclear weapons to the Zionist regime and report the results of its findings to the Security Council and the General Assembly during current year.
- In the framework of nonproliferation measures, nuclear-weapon states be prohibited from any kind of nuclear cooperation with non-members and commit themselves not to transfer any kind of nuclear material, equipment and technology.

Iran's ambassador to the IAEA said he had offered proposals for a better future for the IAEA.

== Results ==
A 15-point communique was released at the end of the conference.

Ahmadinejad called for "an independent international group which plans and oversees nuclear disarmament and prevents proliferation...This group should act in a way where all independent countries and governments could have a say and role in running the affairs of that group. Until now the presence and political domination of the agency has prevented them from carrying out their duties and has diverted the agency from performing its legal obligations." He also took blows at the United States in saying "[Those who] possess, have used or threatened to use nuclear weapons [should] be suspended from the IAEA and its board of governors, especially the US which has used a weapon made of atomic waste in the Iraq war." He suggested that the United States and its vast arsenal of atomic warheads was delaying the long-awaited prospect of global nuclear disarmament. He said its so-called deterrence policy had been the primary reason behind the proliferation of WMD's in recent years. "Washington has not only applied nuclear weapons against other nations, but has for years threatened to use weapons of mass destruction against world countries in order to gain the upper hand...such countries should be stripped of their membership to the International Atomic Energy Agency (IAEA). They have no place [in the UN nuclear watchdog] or its Board of Governors." Iran's ambassador to the IAEA said he had offered proposals to better the body in the future.

On 18 April, Iran's Foreign Minister indicated that "Iran plans to hold talks with all 15 members of the UN Security Council in an effort to break a deadlock over a nuclear fuel deal." Mottaki said "The talks will focus on the fuel exchange [deal]. They will be conducted by Iran's missions in those countries. In principle the issue of fuel exchange has been agreed upon ... We think ... details could be worked out."

== Reactions ==
=== Iranian reactions ===
The Iranian Foreign Ministry spokesman, Ramin Mehmanparast, saying "The estimates show that this conference will be warmly welcomed by countries" He added a thinly veiled attack on the United States in saying that "The world is currently witnessing discrimination. On one hand, using nuclear energy for peaceful purposes is limited while at the same time, countries which possess nuclear weapons do not allow nations to access nuclear energy. These countries allow themselves to use nuclear weapons and announce that they will not hesitate to use these arms against other nations. This can lead to a collective effort. The international community would like to set in motion a real move to enjoy nuclear technology for peaceful purposes and for national development. We are witnessing big threats by possessors of nuclear weapons. They are boldly threatening to use nukes. Any use of nuclear weapons to harm humanity is condemned." The Deputy Foreign Minister for Education and Research, Mohammad Bagher Khorramshad accusing the West of having made a hue and cry to prevent the conference from going through because they feared the conference would question their own sincerity to international community and adding that "A few colonial powers seek to monopolize production of nuclear energy and deprive other of it. It is among [the] legitimate rights of every nation to make use of nuclear technology and no one is authorized to deprive them of such a privilege. Meanwhile, Mottaki closed the conference saying that "Those who think of attacking Iran are playing with fire. They will very well realize the consequences of their actions. "We don't believe they will attack. We do not see they have the capacity on the ground." He also called the conference a success because the participants achieved the goal of highlighting the necessity of nuclear disarmament.

Unofficial reaction came from such places as the academics at the University of Tehran, one of whom suggested that "Most countries in the world do feel that the UN Security Council as well as the IAEA board of governors is not democratic, so it is something that most people in the south have a great deal of sympathy with. The problem that Iran is facing right now is the fact that western countries are very much biased against the country. So he is using this opportunity to point out Iran's position and show that it is a very reasonable and logical one and the reason that Iran is unable to get its voice across is because these bodies are undemocratic."

=== External reactions ===
==== Countries ====
- Iraq / Lebanon / Syria The foreign ministers of Iraq, Lebanon and Syria also supported Iran's right to nuclear technology while condemning Israel's nuclear arsenal. Syria's Walid Muallem said "We back Iran for pursuing peaceful nuclear technology. The major threat in the region is Israel which has nuclear warheads. Israel must join this treaty and take quick steps to destroy its nuclear weapons which number over 200 warheads." His Lebanese counterpart, Ali al-Shami, said Iran was seeking "nuclear energy for peaceful aims and it was not deviating from the treaty." Adding that Israel needed to be "stripped" off its nuclear arsenal. "There is more need to strip Israel of its nuclear arsenal, as the international community is aware of its nuclear weapons capability and that this regime has defiantly declared it will use these weapons whenever it wants. Since the atomic weapons of the Zionist regime are not inspected, there is a danger of these weapons being used in future. This regime must join the NPT without any conditions." Iraq's Hoshyar Zebari chimed in that "We reject any threat against Iran and insist on Iran's rights to use peaceful nuclear energy." On the sidelines Iran's parliamentary speaker and Lebanon's Shami also criticised Israel. Parliament Speaker Ali Larijani said Muslim states must try to prevent Israel from "implementing its hostile plans" because they have "a religious responsibility" to do so. "The Muslim ummah must take serious and practical steps against the immeasurable number of atrocities carried out by Israel in various parts of Palestine especially, [Jerusalem] al-Quds." He called Lebanon "the symbol of resistance against Israel," and praised the Lebanese determination to fight Israel. Shami said the Lebanon would never forget the support Iran has shown to Lebanon's resistance movement. He added that Israel's policies toward the region were focused on expansionist policies, therefore "Islamic and Arab states in the region and around the world need to take a steadfast stance against Israel's evil policies that include the Judisization of al-Quds."
  - Lebanon Upon returning home after the conference Lebanon's foreign minister called for the UN to pressure Israel: "Regional and international communities should pressure the Security Council into imposing sanctions against Israel."
- Russia The Russian Deputy Foreign Minister at the conference "called for more confidence-building measures from Tehran to allay international concerns over its nuclear program". Russia added that the conference "is an excellent opportunity to have a free-flowing exchange of views on some critical issues. We are discussing scenarios and the way to go forward to this goal [of having nuclear energy for all, and nuclear weapons for none. [World powers, however, remain united over] a set of issues that are not resolved that maybe considered satisfactory by the United States and some other countries."
- Oman Oman said the conference is indicative of Iran's peaceful nuclear programme: "The Islamic Republic of Iran emphasizes that it is pursuing a peaceful, and not - as certain states claim - a military (nuclear) goal. We have taken part in the Tehran conference in a bid to reemphasize that Iran's nuclear program is peaceful."
- Singapore Singapore disavowed the statement Iran issued after the conference, saying "The ministry said there was no agreement among delegates to the Tehran Conference to issue such a document, and 'neither was there any discussion on the contents of the document."
- United States The US., amongst other countries, also welcomed the Iranian decision to resume talk on a nuclear fuel swap.

==== Miscellaneous ====
- Paul Ingram, executive director of the British American Security Information Council, said that "the Tehran conference will undermine US strategies in forming a front against Iran. Obama held the Nuclear Security Summit in an aim to reach an international consensus against Iran; however, his efforts were of no avail." He added that the conference could increase international support for Iran as well as lessen tension.
- Time Magazine noted that while "the Tehran conference yielded few concrete results," despite Iran's failure to comply with all the transparency demands of the IAEA "there was evidence at Iran's summit that Tehran's nuclear strategy is succeeding."

== Controversies ==
Iran said there would be some sort of American representation at the conference, however this was denied by the US State Department which stated that no US official had been invited.

Former Iranian president Mohammad Khatami was encouraged not to attend another nuclear disarmament conference in Hiroshima, Japan. His aide claimed there was an outright ban on him leaving the country.

== See also ==
- International Conference on Nuclear Disarmament, Oslo, 2008
- Nuclear proliferation
  - Nuclear disarmament
