= Tehran Conference (disambiguation) =

The Tehran Conference was a meeting of the three main Allied leaders during World War II.

Tehran Conference may also refer to:

- International Conference to Review the Global Vision of the Holocaust in Tehran in 2006
- Tehran International Conference on Disarmament and Non-Proliferation, on 17 and 18 April 2010
