= Kosovo–Lebanon relations =

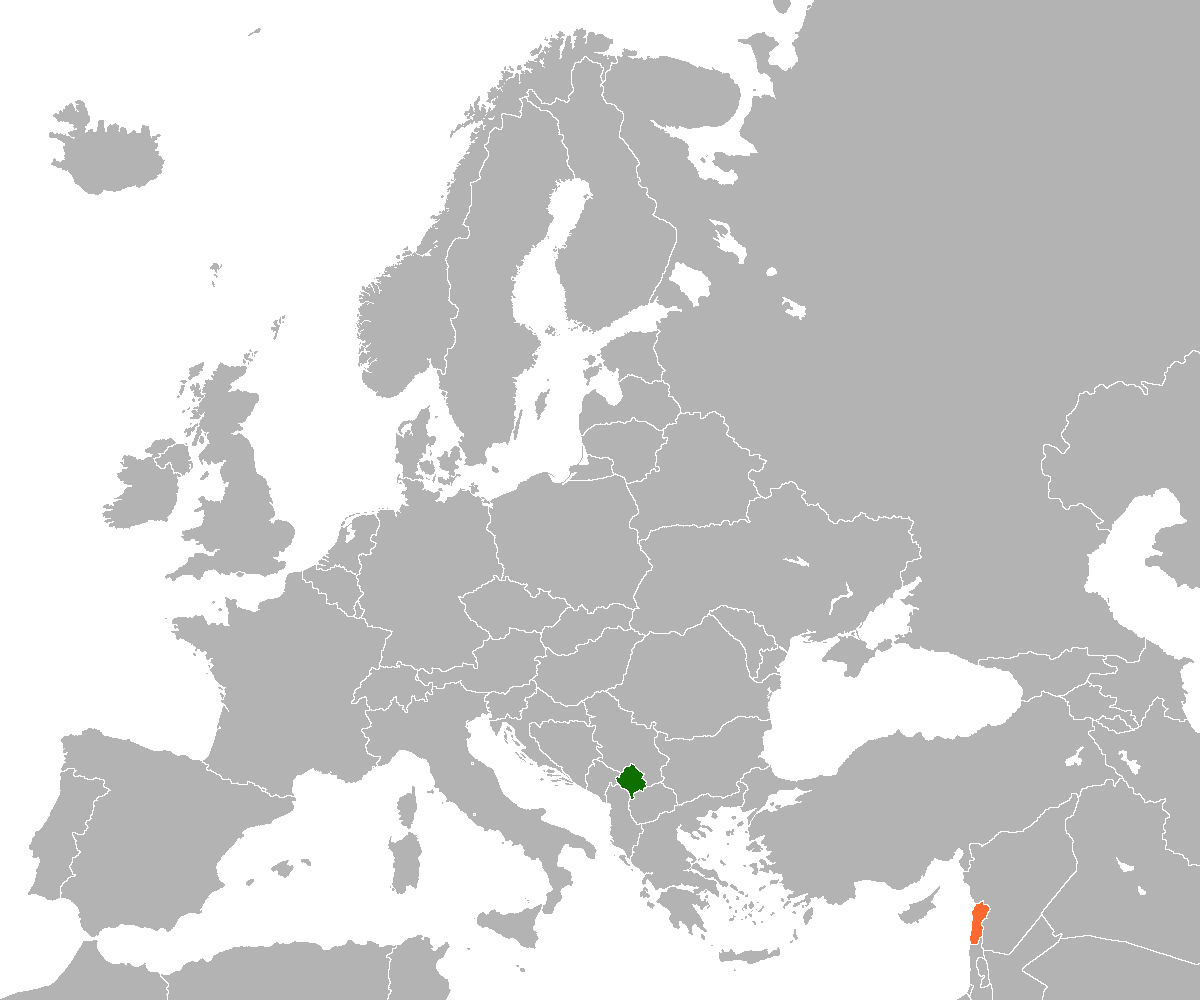
- Kosovo: Lebanon

Kosovo–Lebanon relations are foreign relations between Kosovo and Lebanon. Formal diplomatic relations between two states have not been established as Lebanon has not recognized Kosovo as a sovereign state.

== History ==
At a meeting on 28 May 2009 with Kosovo's Foreign Minister, Skënder Hyseni, the representative of Lebanon to the United Nations, Nawaf Salam, reportedly said that Lebanon would continue to support Kosovo and that the government of Lebanon is seeking the moment for recognition. In a November 2009 meeting between an Albanian delegation led by Deputy Foreign Minister, Edith Harxhi, and Lebanese officials including prime minister Saad Hariri, the Lebanese side reportedly said that Lebanon would soon recognise Kosovo. However, the Lebanese ambassador in Belgrade, Cehad Mualem, was later reported as saying that there was no possibility of Lebanon recognising Kosovo in the near future, and said that Lebanon would wait for the decision of the International Court of Justice.

In a February 2012 meeting with the speaker of Albanian Parliament, Jozefina Topalli, the Lebanese prime minister, Najib Mikati, said that the issue of Kosovo's recognition was being considered very seriously.

In December 2013, Lebanese Foreign Minister Adnan Mansour promised to consider Kosovo's request for recognition.

On 29 November 2018, Lebanese Foreign Minister Gebran Bassil visited Belgrade and affirmed in a joint press conference with his Serbian counterpart, Ivica Dačić, that Lebanon supported "the sovereignty and territorial integrity" of Serbia. Bassil also added "Lebanon and Serbia share common sovereign tendencies, as well as their rejection of division and isolation."

== See also ==
- Foreign relations of Kosovo
- Foreign relations of Lebanon
