= Global Zero (campaign) =

Organization dedicated to achieving the elimination of nuclear weapons

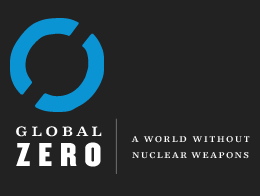

Global Zero was an international non-partisan group of 300 world leaders dedicated to achieving the elimination of nuclear weapons. The initiative, launched in December 2008, promoted a phased withdrawal and verification for the destruction of all devices held by official and unofficial members of the nuclear club. The Global Zero campaign worked toward building an international consensus and a sustained global movement of leaders and citizens for the elimination of nuclear weapons.

Goals included the initiation of United States–Russia bilateral negotiations for reductions to 1,000 total warheads each and commitments from the other key nuclear weapons countries to participate in multilateral negotiations for phased reductions of nuclear arsenals. Global Zero worked to expand the diplomatic dialogue with key governments and continued to develop policy proposals on the critical issues related to the elimination of nuclear weapons.

Global Zero suspended operations indefinitely at the end of 2023.

== Action plan ==
The Global Zero plan for the phased, verified elimination of all nuclear weapons was a four-phase strategy to reach a global zero accord over 14 years (2010–2023) and to complete the dismantlement of all remaining nuclear warheads over the following seven years (2024–2030).

Phase 1 (2010–2013) Following conclusion of a START replacement accord, negotiate a bilateral accord for the United States and Russia to reduce to 1,000 total warheads each.

Phase 2 (2014–2018) In a multilateral framework, the U.S. and Russia reach agreement to reduce to 500 total warheads each (to be implemented by 2021) as long as all other nuclear weapons countries agree to freeze their stockpiles until 2018, followed by proportional reductions until 2021. Establish a comprehensive verification and enforcement system, and strengthen safeguards on the civilian nuclear fuel cycle to prevent diversion of materials to build weapons.

Phase 3 (2019–2023) Negotiate a global zero accord, signed by all nuclear capable countries, for the phased, verified, proportional reduction of all nuclear arsenals to zero total warheads by 2030.

Phase 4 (2024–2030) Complete the phased, verified, proportional reduction of all nuclear arsenals to zero total warheads by 2030 and continue the verification and enforcement system.

In releasing the plan, the Commission noted that over the past 20 years (1989–2009), the United States and Russia retired and destroyed twice as many nuclear warheads (40,000+) as this action plan proposed (20,000+) over the next twenty years (2009–2030).

== Creation ==
Global Zero was launched in Paris in December 2008 by more than 100 political, civic, and military leaders. There, they announced a framework plan for the elimination of nuclear weapons, starting with deep reductions to the U.S. and Russian arsenals. Global Zero gave letters signed by more than 90 Global Zero leaders to President of the United States Barack Obama and President of the Russian Federation Dmitry Medvedev, urging them to commit to the elimination of nuclear weapons. Global Zero Commissioners Senator Chuck Hagel and Ambassador Richard Burt met with President Medvedev in Moscow and discussed the agenda.

== Meetings ==
On April 1, 2009, the two presidents met in London and issued a historic joint statement committing their "two countries to achieving a nuclear free world" and three days later in a speech in Prague, President Obama declared his intention to "seek to include all nuclear weapons states in this endeavor." On the day of the meeting, the Times (of London) published an op-ed authored by six Global Zero leaders. Negotiations began between the two countries for a New START nuclear arms reduction treaty.

Prior to the July 6–8, 2009 Obama–Medvedev Summit, the international Global Zero Commission of 23 political and military leaders released a comprehensive, end-to-end plan for the elimination of nuclear weapons over the next 20 years. At their Summit, Presidents Obama and Medvedev announced a framework agreement for new reductions to U.S. and Russian arsenals—a critical first step toward multilateral negotiations for the elimination of all nuclear weapons as called for in the Global Zero Action Plan (GZAP).

At the 35th G8 summit in July 2009, world leaders announced their support of the Obama-Medvedev commitment to eliminate all nuclear weapons and called on all countries to "undertake further steps in nuclear disarmament." Global Zero leaders believe the international consensus for the elimination of nuclear weapons is reaching a critical mass, especially given the declarations of political leaders during the special U.N. Security Council session on proliferation and disarmament convened by President Obama (September 24, 2009). President Obama received the 2009 Nobel Peace Prize in acknowledgment to his efforts for nuclear disarmament.

During 2010, the initiative continued with the Global Zero Summit (February 2–4, 2010), signing of the New START treaty (April 8, 2010), the Nuclear Security Summit (April 12–13, 2010) and the Non Proliferation Treaty Review Conference (May 3–28, 2010).

== Indefinite suspension ==
Global Zero suspended its operations at the end of 2023, stating that it had had "a challenging year of financial uncertainty and stress". It described the period of suspension as indefinite.

== Public opinion ==
Building public opinion supportive of the elimination of nuclear weapons was part of the goal of the Global Zero campaign. These included encouraging media worldwide to make the elimination of nuclear weapons a leading global policy issue, to launch a global student campaign, and to expand the online citizen membership and the cadre of leaders.

A poll conducted in 2008 in 21 countries found that 76% of over 19,000 people surveyed favored the verified elimination of nuclear weapons.

== Criticism ==
American economist and arms control strategist Thomas Schelling argued that Global Zero advocates did not explicitly address the question of why we should expect a world without nuclear weapons to be safer than one with some nuclear weapons. "That drastic reductions make sense, and that some measure to reduce alert status do, too, may require no extensive analysis. But considering how much intellectual effort in the past half century went into the study of the 'stability' of a nuclear deterrence world, it ought to be worthwhile to examine contingencies in a nuclear free world to verify that it is superior to a world with (some) nuclear weapons." Schelling argued that prospects for significant reductions in nuclear arms between Russia and the United States are good and should contribute to "nuclear quiescence". Concern over Iran, North Korea, and non-state actors is justified, but complete nuclear disarmament of Russia, the United States, China, France and the United Kingdom is tangential to those prospects, Schelling argued. "Except for some 'rogue' threats, there is little that could disturb the quiet nuclear relations among the recognized nuclear nations. This nuclear quiet should not be traded away for a world in which a brief race to reacquire nuclear weapons could become every former nuclear state's overriding preoccupation."

== See also ==
- Anti-nuclear movement
- Nuclear proliferation
- Nuclear Non-Proliferation Treaty
- Nuclear weapons debate
- Nuclear Threat Initiative
- Win Without War
