= Adnan Mansour =

Lebanese politician (born 1946)

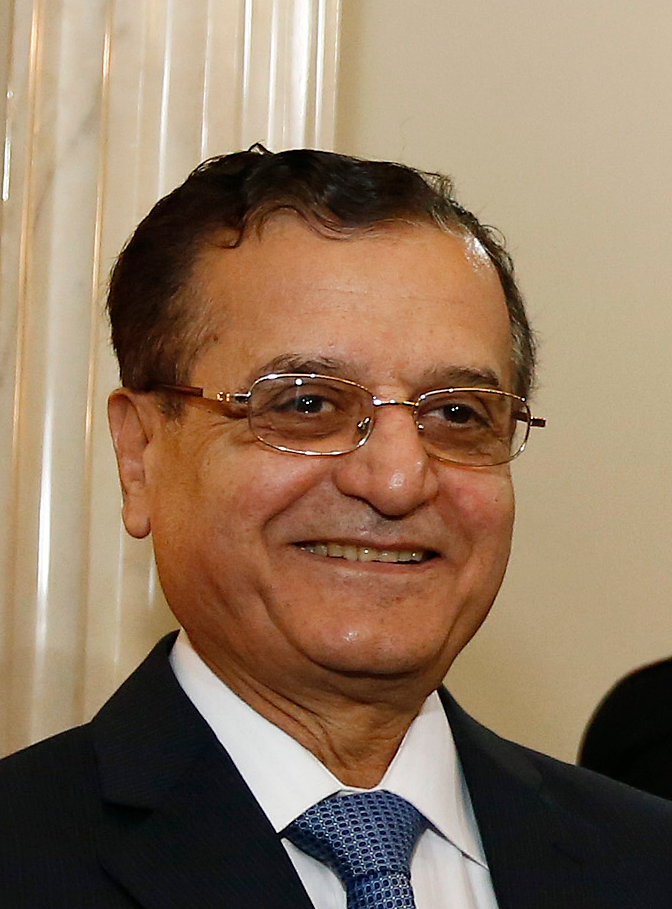
- Adnan Mansour in 2013

Minister of Foreign Affairs and Emigrants
- In office 13 June 2011 – 15 February 2014
- Prime Minister: Najib Mikati
- Preceded by: Ali Al Shami
- Succeeded by: Gebran Bassil

Personal details
- Born: Adnan Hassan Mansour; 5 January 1946 (age 80) Bourj el-Barajneh, Lebanon
- Party: Independent
- Education: St. Joseph University
- Website: Official website

Adnan Mansour (Arabic: عدنان منصور; born 5 January 1946) is a Lebanese diplomat, politician and the former minister of foreign affairs and emigrants.

== Early life and education ==
Mansour was born in Bourj el-Barajneh on 5 January 1946 into a Shi'ite family. He obtained a bachelor's degree in administrative sciences and policies from St. Joseph University in Beirut. He holds a master's degree in political theory and a PhD in political science.

== Career ==
Mansour began his career at the Foreign Ministry in 1974. He worked as Lebanon's consul in various countries, including Australia, Sudan and Egypt. From 1990 to 1994, he was the Lebanese ambassador to the Democratic Republic of the Congo. He also served as the Lebanese ambassador to Iran from 1999 to 2007. His last diplomatic posts were Lebanese ambassador to the Grand Duchy of Luxembourg from 2007 to 2010 and to the Kingdom of Belgium from 2007 to 2011.

Then Mansour served as an aide to Parliament Speaker Nabih Berri, and became a member of the Amal Movement. Mansour was appointed minister of foreign affairs and emigrants on 13 June 2011, replacing Ali Al Shami in the post. Mansour was part of the March 8 coalition in the Najib Mikati's cabinet.

Mansour visited Libya in January 2012, the first visit by a Lebanese diplomat to the country in thirty years. In September 2012, he and a Lebanese judge went to Mauritania to search for the possibility of questioning the former Libyan intelligence chief Abdullah Senussi, who served during the Muammar Gaddafi's era about the fate of Imam Musa Sadr.

Gebran Bassil replaced Mansour as foreign minister in February 2014.

=== Views and alliances ===
Mansour has a pro-Syrian stance and is close to the Nabih Berri. Nayla Tueni, a Lebanese journalist and deputy, called him the foreign minister of Syria in Lebanon. In September 2012, after the negative remarks of Hezbollah leader Hassan Nasrallah about the movie Innocence of Muslims, Mansour argued that Arab foreign ministers should meet to denounce the movie. Mansour's remarks were criticized by Lebanese politicians and cabinet members, including labor minister Salim Jreissati. In the summit of the Council of Arab Foreign Ministers in Cairo held on 6 March 2013, Mansour argued that Syria should rejoin the Arab League. His remarks again drew criticism both from the Lebanese government and Arab states of the Persian Gulf.

== Personal life ==
Mansour is married to Layla Fakhoury. They have three children.
