= International Conference on Nuclear Disarmament, Oslo, 2008 =

Multilateral disarmament conference

The International Conference on Nuclear Disarmament took place in Oslo on 26 and 27 February 2008. It was organized by The Government of Norway, the Norwegian Radiation Protection Authority in collaboration with the NTI (Nuclear Threat Initiative) and the Hoover Institute. The Conference, entitled "Achieving the Vision of a World Free of Nuclear Weapons", had the purpose of building consensus between nuclear weapon states and non-nuclear weapon states and about the importance of all the actions in the NPT.

The specific aims were twofold:

1. To identify and formulate disarmament, non-proliferation and nuclear risk reduction proposals that can realistically be implemented in the mid-term (2–5 years)
2. To discuss long-term objectives and how progress can be made toward achieving them.

The conference focused on the discussion over several issues, some of them were: what nuclear-weapon states and non-nuclear-weapon states can do to reduce the role of nuclear weapons in national security policies, how regional conflicts impact efforts to reduce nuclear dangers, the role of treaties and ways of reconciling nuclear energy expansion with nonproliferation efforts.

== The panelists ==
The panelists were:

- Dr. Alexei Arbatov Scholar-in-Residence, Carnegie Moscow Center
- Ms. Irma Arguello Founder and chairwoman, Nonproliferation for Global Security Foundation - NPSGlobal, Buenos Aires
- Dr. Bruce Blair President, World Security Institute, Washington D.C.
- Dr. Hans Blix Chairman, The Weapons of Mass Destruction Commission, Stockholm
- Ambassador Richard Butler Convenor, Canberra Commission on the Elimination of Nuclear Weapons
- Dr. Shahram Chubin Director of Studies, Geneva Centre for Security Policy
- Mr. Jayantha Dhanapala Visiting professor, Simon Fraser University
- Dr. Sidney Drell Senior Fellow, Hoover Institution, Stanford University
- Ambassador Sergio Duarte High Representative for Disarmament Affairs, United Nations, New York City
- Mr. Robert Einhorn Senior Adviser, Center for Strategic and International Studies, Washington D.C.
- Dr. Mohamed ElBaradei Director General, IAEA, Vienna
- Dr. Ali Fahmy El-Saiedi Executive Advisor to the Board, Power Generation Engineering and Services Co., Cairo
- Mr. Gareth Evans President and Chief Executive, International Crisis Group, Brussels
- Mr. Mark Fitzpatrick Senior Fellow for Non-proliferation, International Institute for Strategic Studies, London
- Ms. Annalisa Giannella Personal Representative to the High Representative for Non-Proliferation of Weapons of Mass Destruction, Council of the European Union, Brussels
- Dr. Pierre Goldschmidt Visiting Fellow, Carnegie Endowment for International Peace, Washington D.C.
- Ambassador James Goodby Visiting Fellow, Hoover Institution, Stanford University
- Ms. Rose Gottemoeller Director, Carnegie Moscow Center
- Dr. Patricia Lewis Director, United Nations Institute for Disarmament Research, Geneva
- Ambassador Abdul Samad Minty Deputy Director-General and Special Representative on Disarmament Affairs, Department of Foreign Affairs, Pretoria
- Ambassador Takeshi Nakane Director General, Disarmament, Non-proliferation and Science Department, Ministry of Foreign Affairs, Tokyo
- Senator Sam Nunn Co-chairman and chief executive officer, Nuclear Threat Initiative, Washington D.C.
- Dr. George Perkovich Vice President for Studies–Global Security and Economic Development, Carnegie Endowment for International Peace, Washington D.C.
- Sir Michael Quinlan Consulting Senior Fellow, International Institute for Strategic Studies, London
- Mr. Vasantha R. Raghavan Lt. Gen. (Ret.) and Director, Delhi Policy Group
- Dr. Ramamurti Rajaraman Co-chair, International Panel on Fissile Materials
- Ms. Joan Rohlfing Senior Vice President for Programs & Operations, Nuclear Threat Initiative, Washington D.C.
- Dr. Dingli Shen Professor, Center for American Studies, Fudan University, Shanghai
- Secretary George Shultz Distinguished Fellow, Hoover Institution, Stanford University
- Mr. Jonas Gahr Støre Ministry of Foreign Affairs, Norway, Oslo

== See also ==
- Nuclear disarmament
