= Ali Al Shami =

Lebanese politician (born 1945)

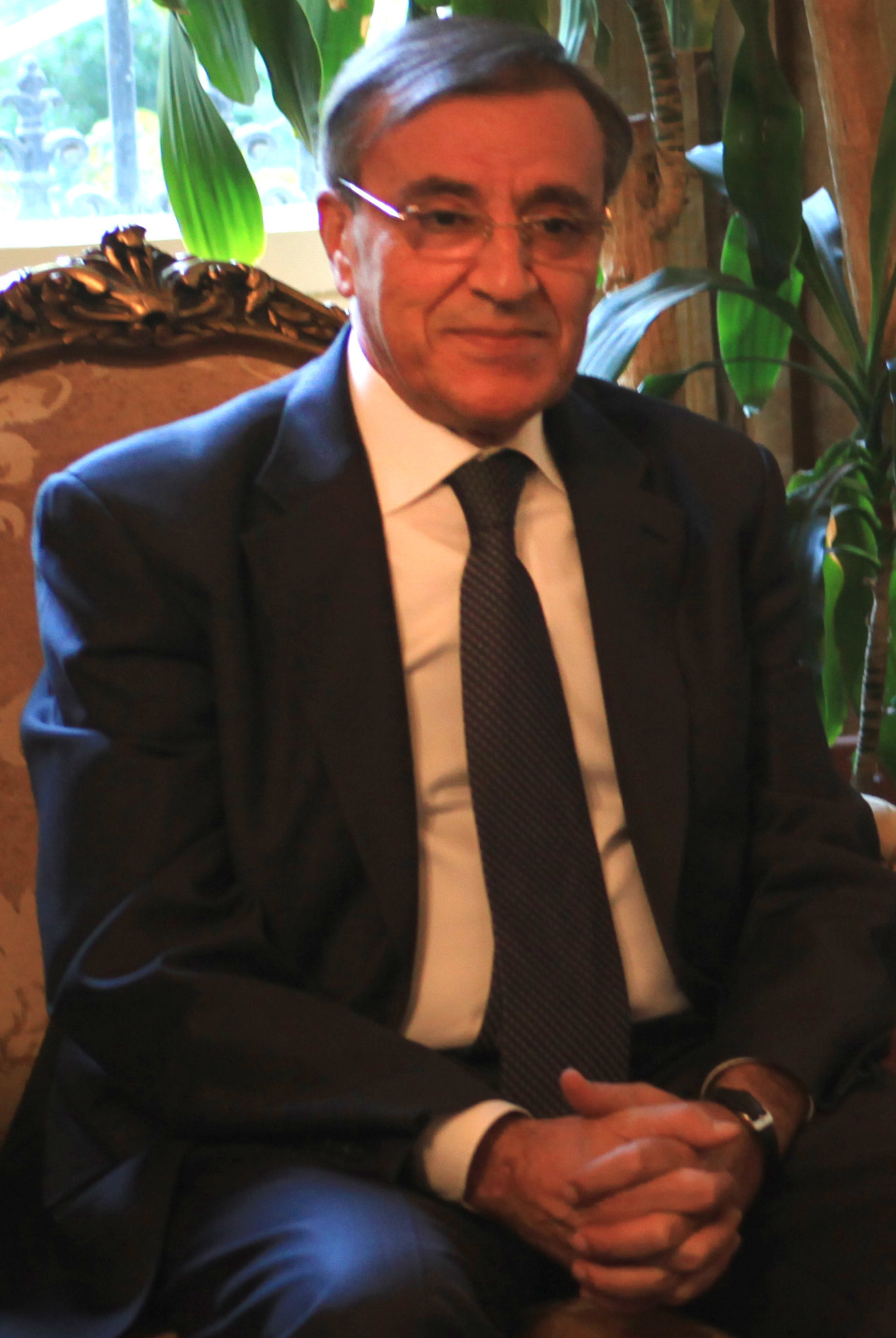

Minister of Foreign Affairs and Emigrants
- In office 9 November 2009 – 13 June 2011
- Prime Minister: Saad Hariri
- Preceded by: Fawzi Salloukh; Tarek Mitri (acting)
- Succeeded by: Adnan Mansour

Personal details
- Born: 21 April 1945 (age 81) Jarjouh, Lebanon
- Party: Amal movement
- Education: Lebanese University; University of Grenoble

Ali Al Shami (Arabic: علي الشامي; born 1945) is a Shia Lebanese academic and a member of the Amal movement. He was Lebanon's minister of foreign affairs and emigrants from 2009 to 2011.

== Early life and education ==
Shami was born into a Shiite family in 1945. He received a bachelor's degree in political science from Lebanese University in 1970 and a diploma again in political science from the University of Grenoble in 1971 as well as a PhD in political science from the same university in 1978.

== Career ==
Shami is a retired university professor.

Shami was part of the committee in charge of writing a program for action of the government led by Prime Minister Saad Hariri in November 2009. He was appointed minister of foreign affairs and emigrants to the cabinet led by Hariri on 9 November 2009. He was named to this post by the Amal leader and Hezbollah ally Parliament Speaker Nabih Berri. He succeeded Fawzi Salloukh as foreign minister. In the cabinet, Shami was part of opposition and a member of the Amal Movement and one of the five Shiite members in the cabinet. Shami's tenure ended in June 2011, and he was replaced by Adnan Mansour in the post.
